= List of tourist attractions in Berlin =

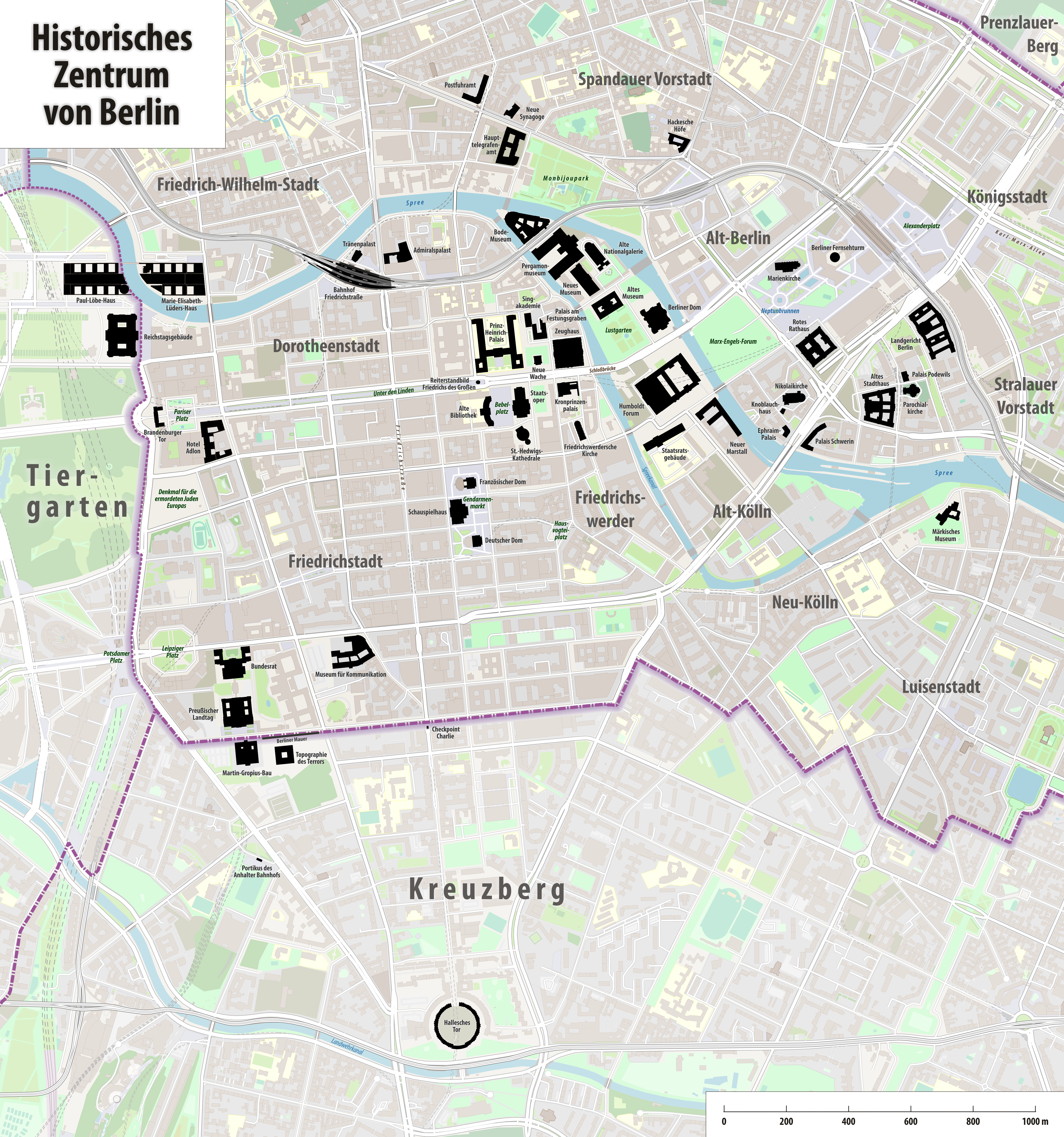
The historical city centre with tourist attractions

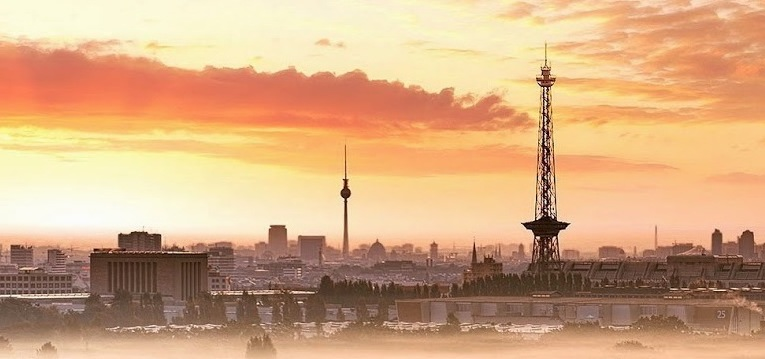
Berlin Panorama

Berlin grew out of the historical city centre, the Nikolai quarter and its adjacent town of Cölln, both situated along the River Spree. It expanded its territories with areas such as Dorotheenstadt and Friedrichstadt. The creation of Greater Berlin in 1920 incorporated many former independent towns and municipalities such as Spandau, Charlottenburg and Köpenick.

Today, the urban environment of the metropolis also spreads to parts of Brandenburg and Potsdam. The decentralised development has resulted in a plethora of sights in Berlin – not just in the centre of the city, but also in the outlying boroughs. For various reasons among the world's most recognized symbols of Berlin are the Brandenburg Gate and its tallest landmark, the Berlin TV tower in Mitte.

== Skyline ==
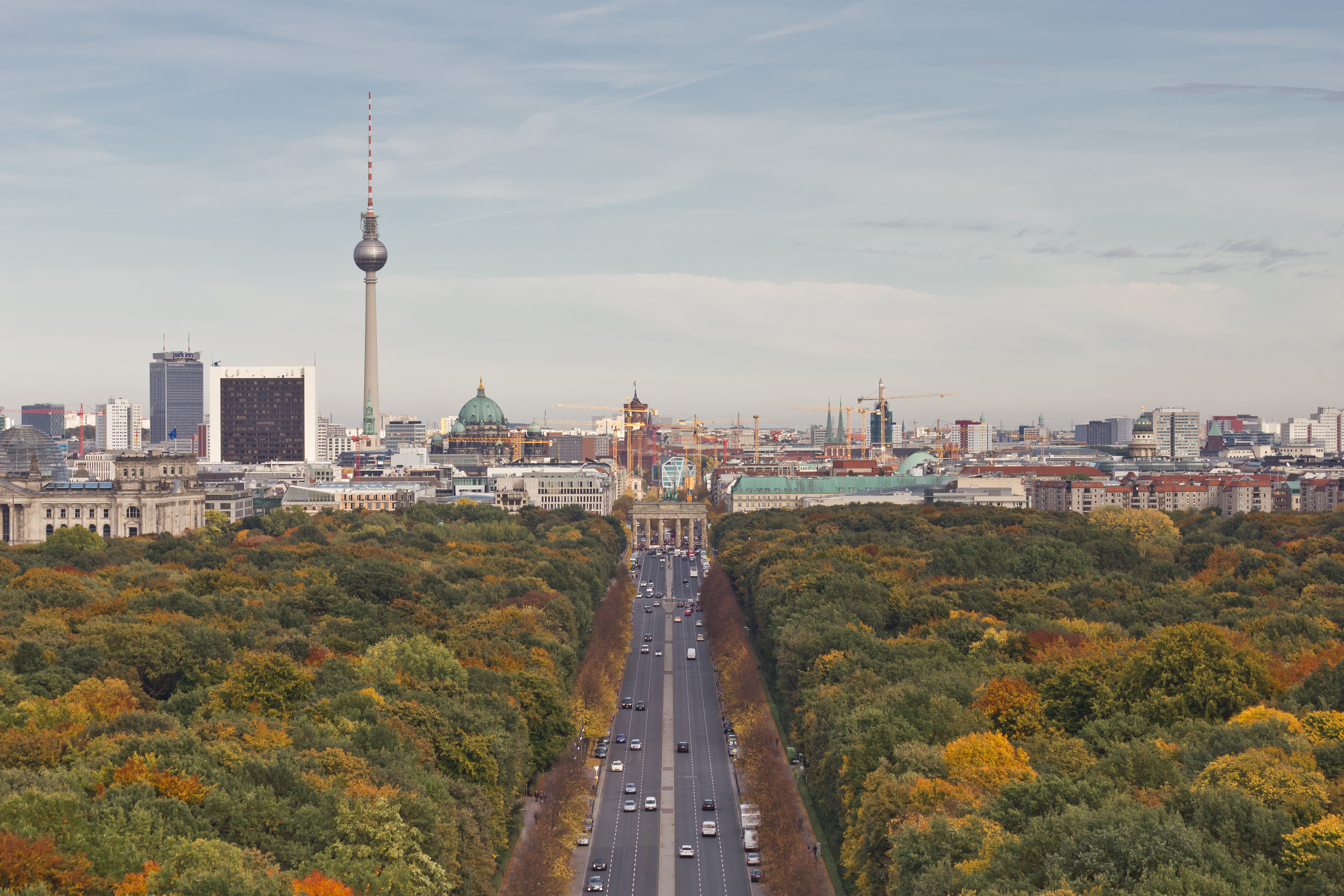
View from Siegessäule

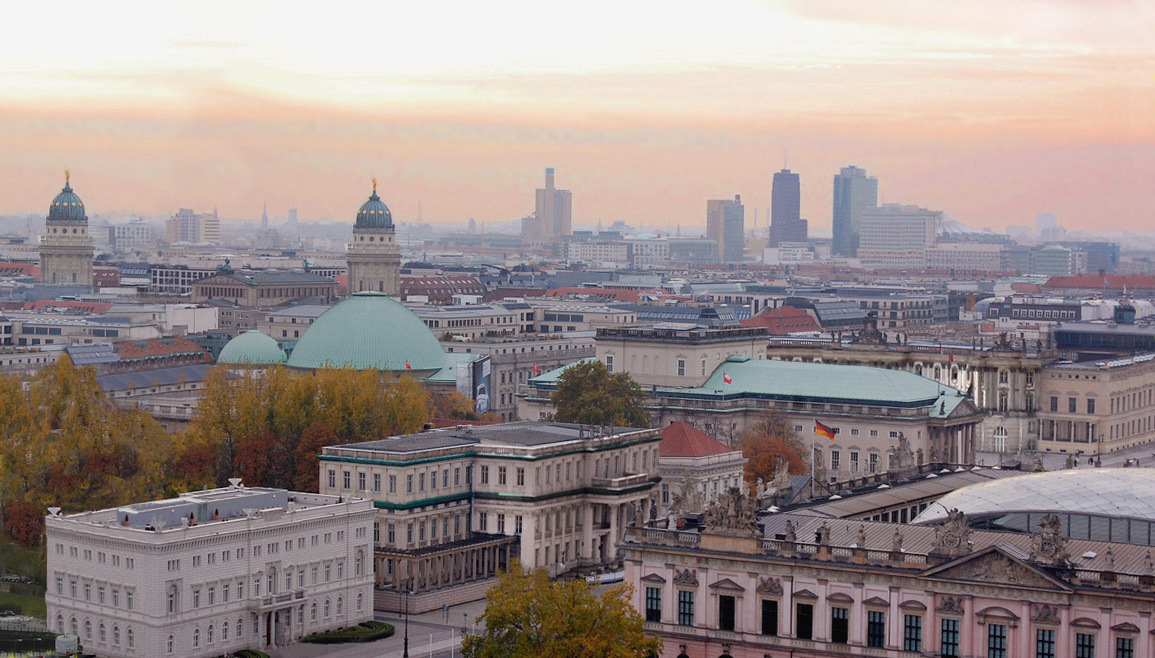
View from Berliner Dom

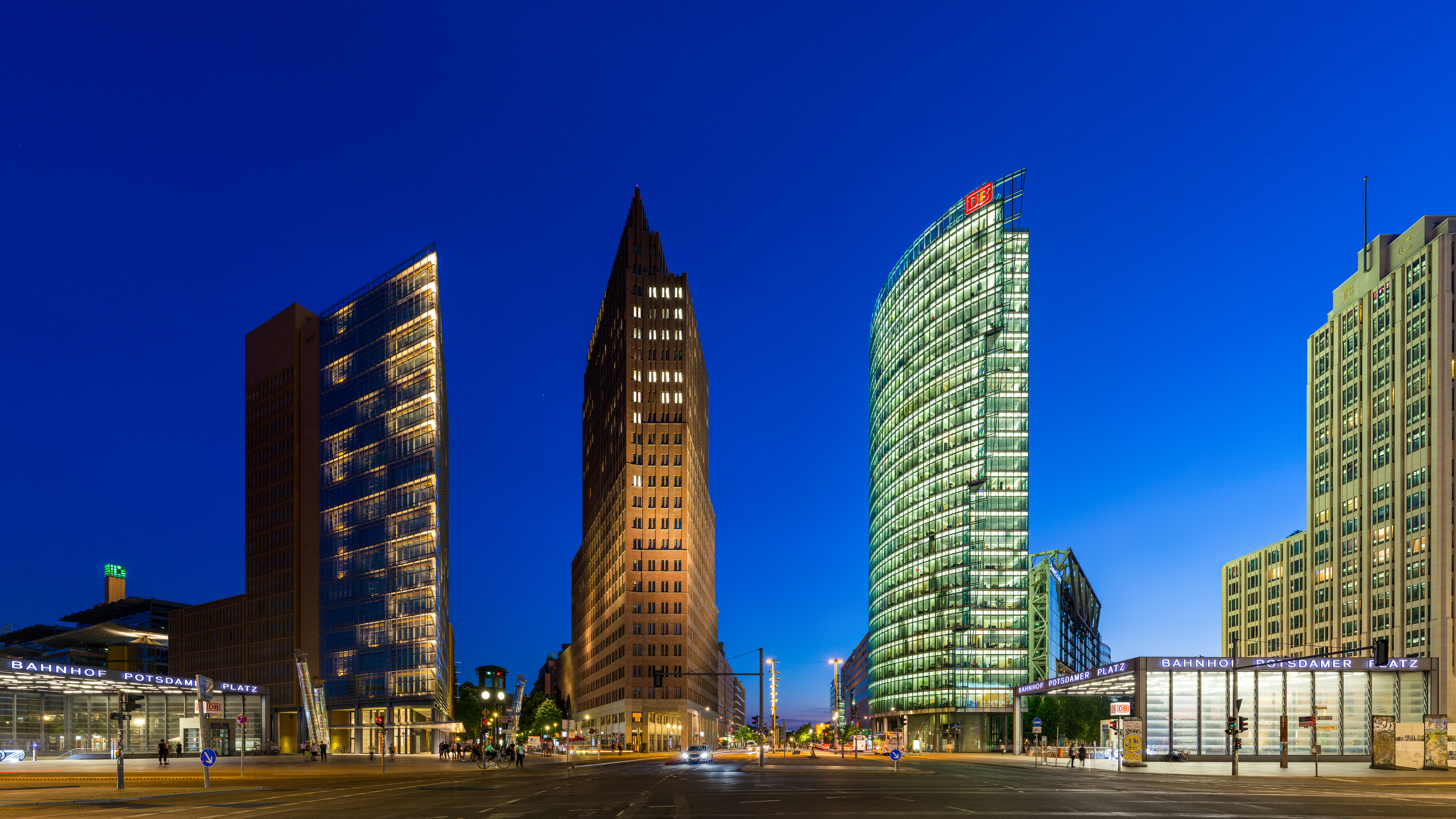
View from Leipziger Platz

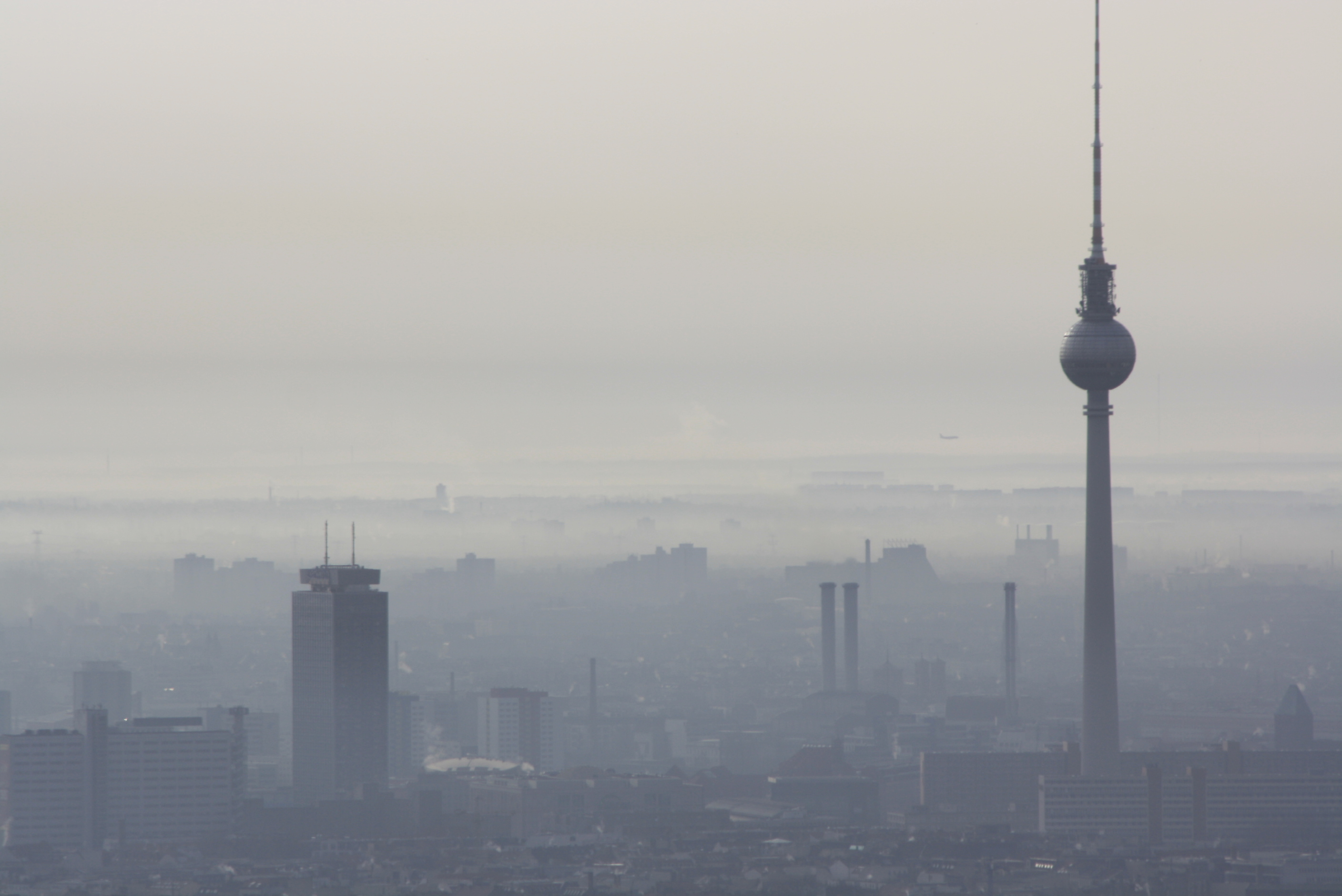
View from Reinickendorf

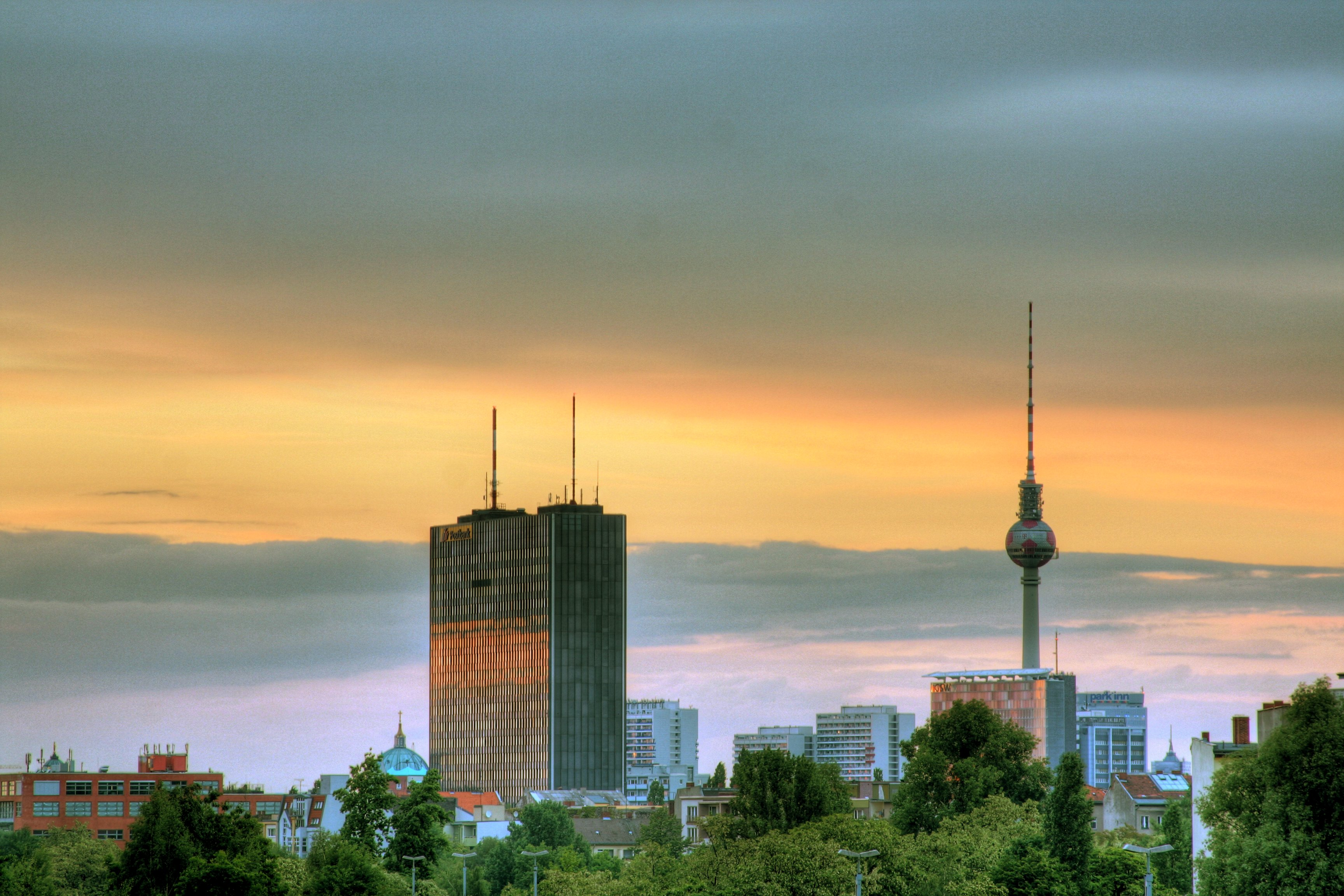
View from Kreuzberg

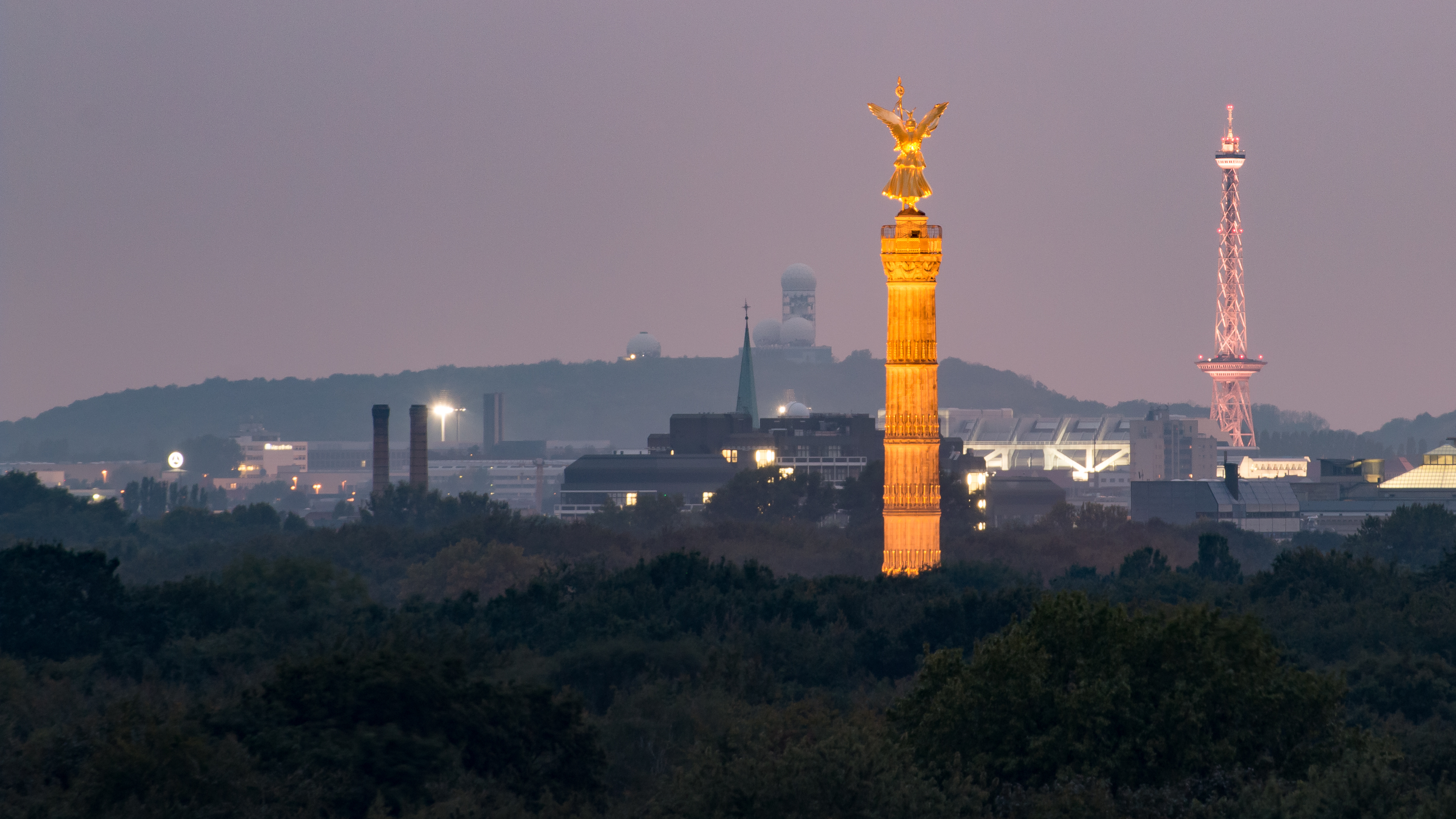
View from Siegessäule (West)

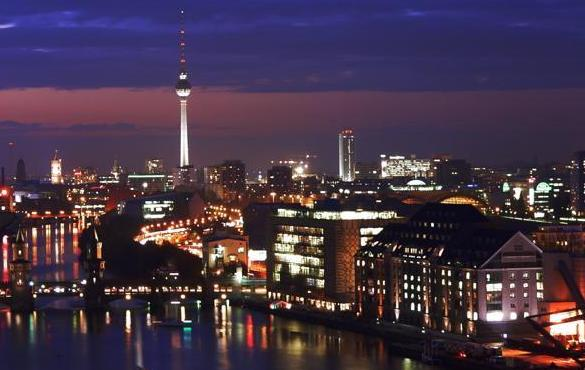
View from Treptower

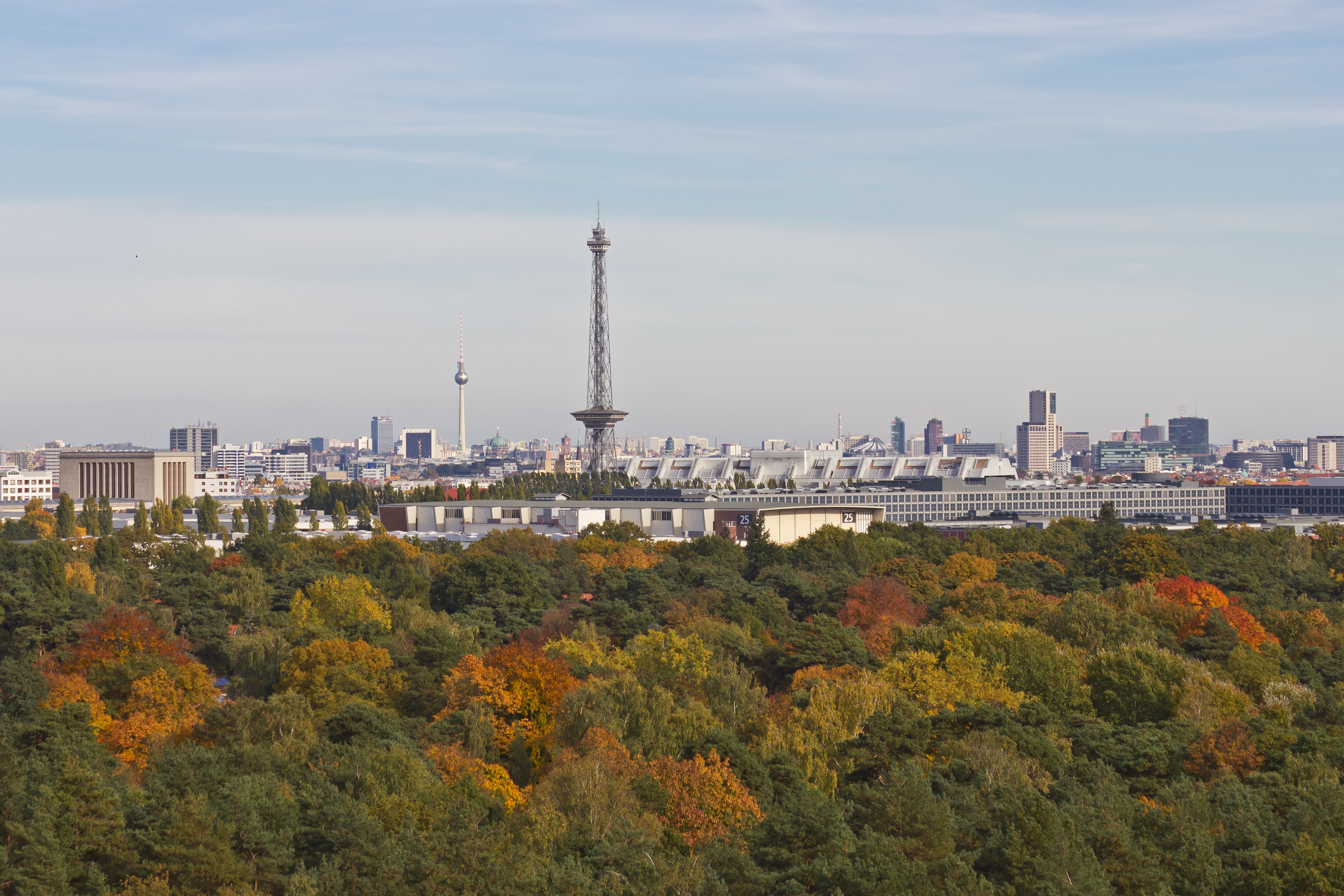
View from Drachenberg

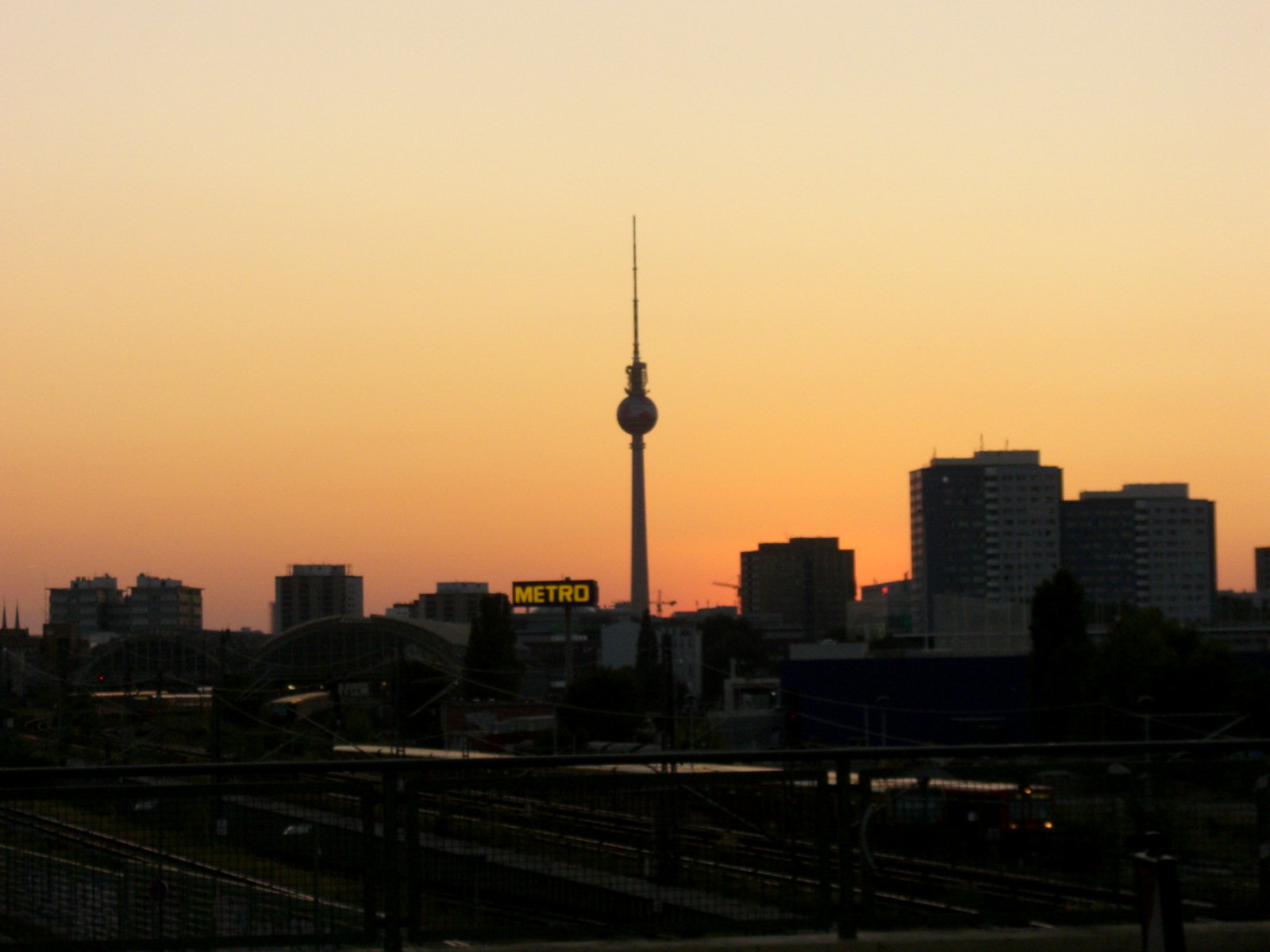
View from Warschauer Brücke

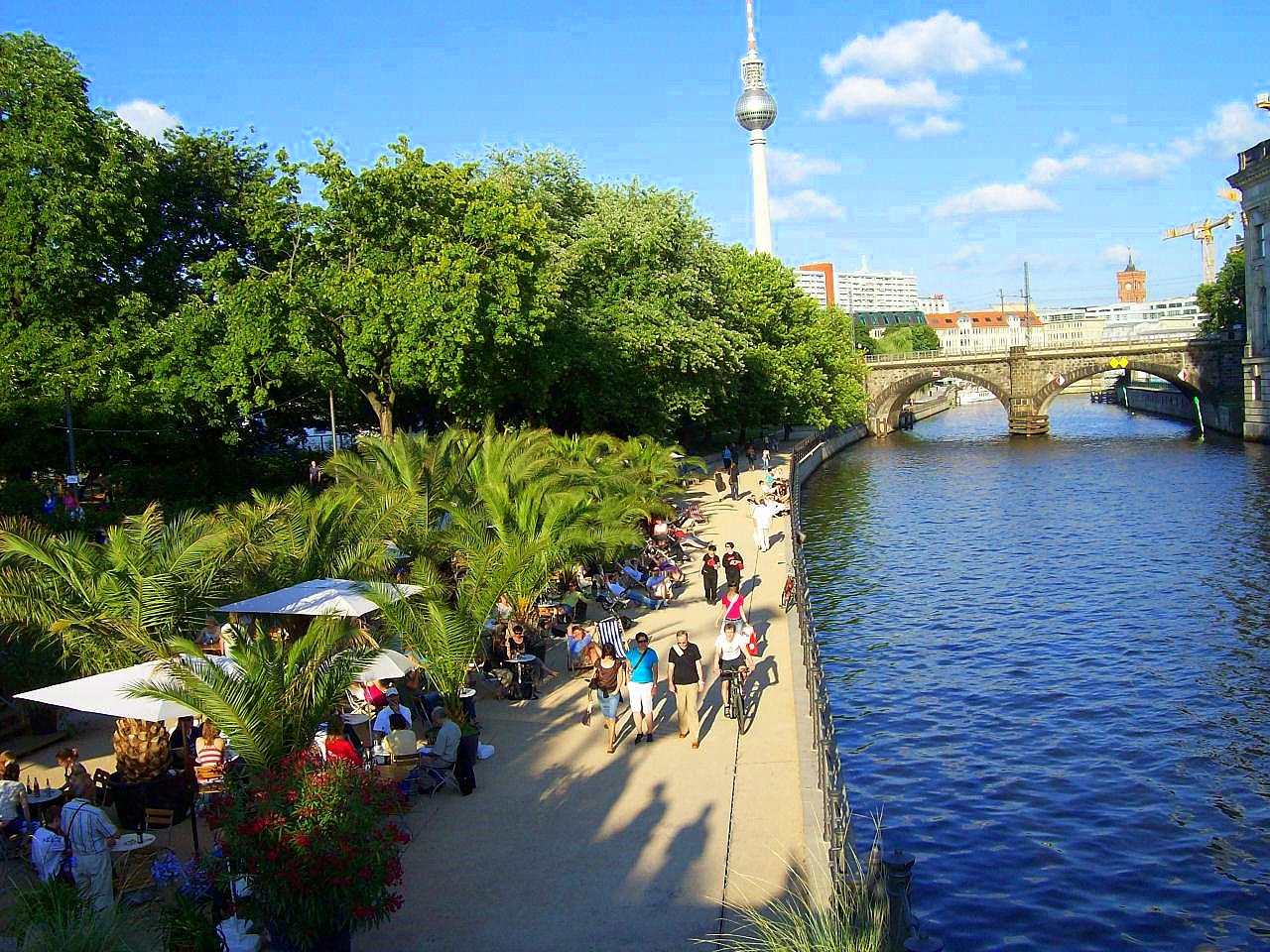
View from River Spree site in Mitte

== World Heritage Sites ==
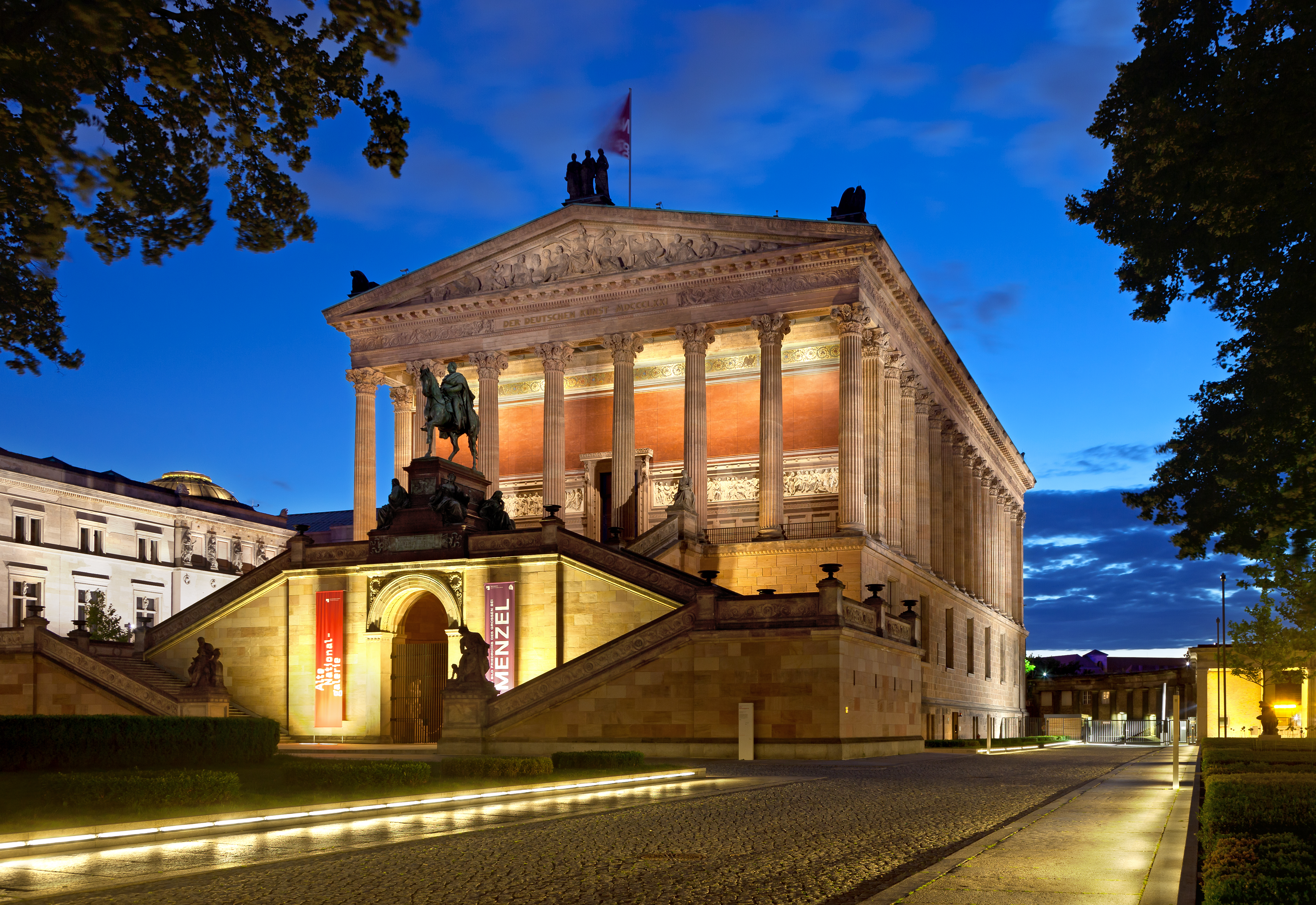
Alte Nationalgalerie

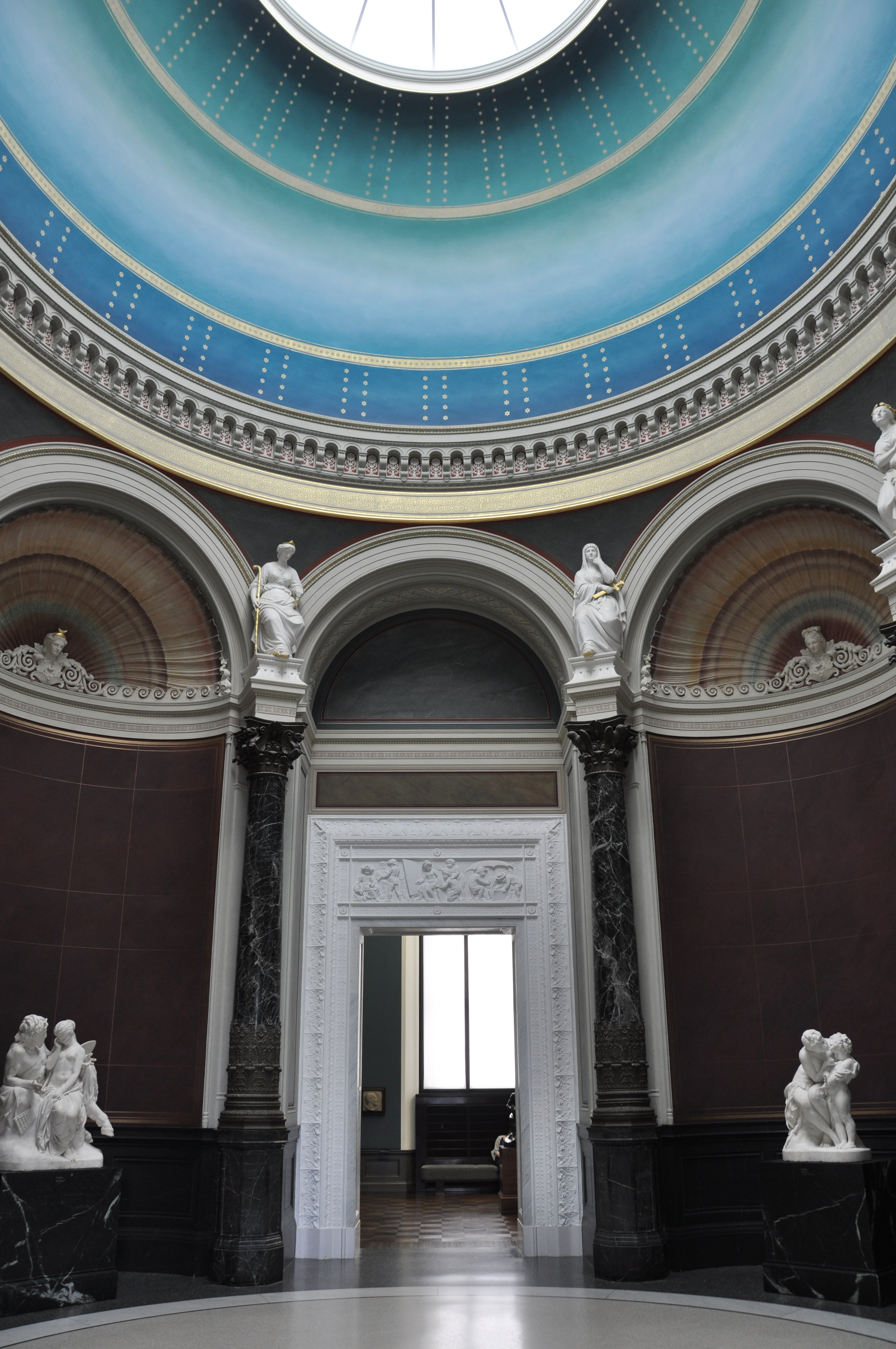
Alte Nationalgalerie

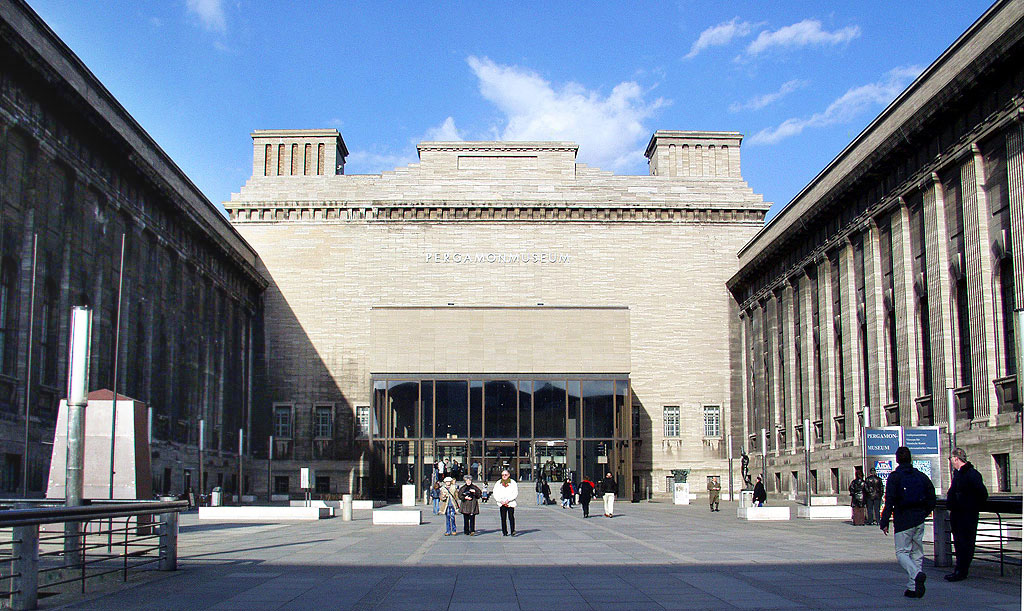
Pergamon Museum

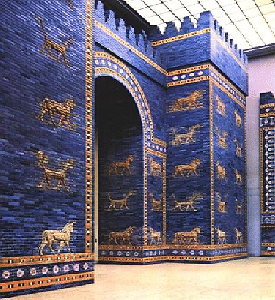
Ishtar Gate

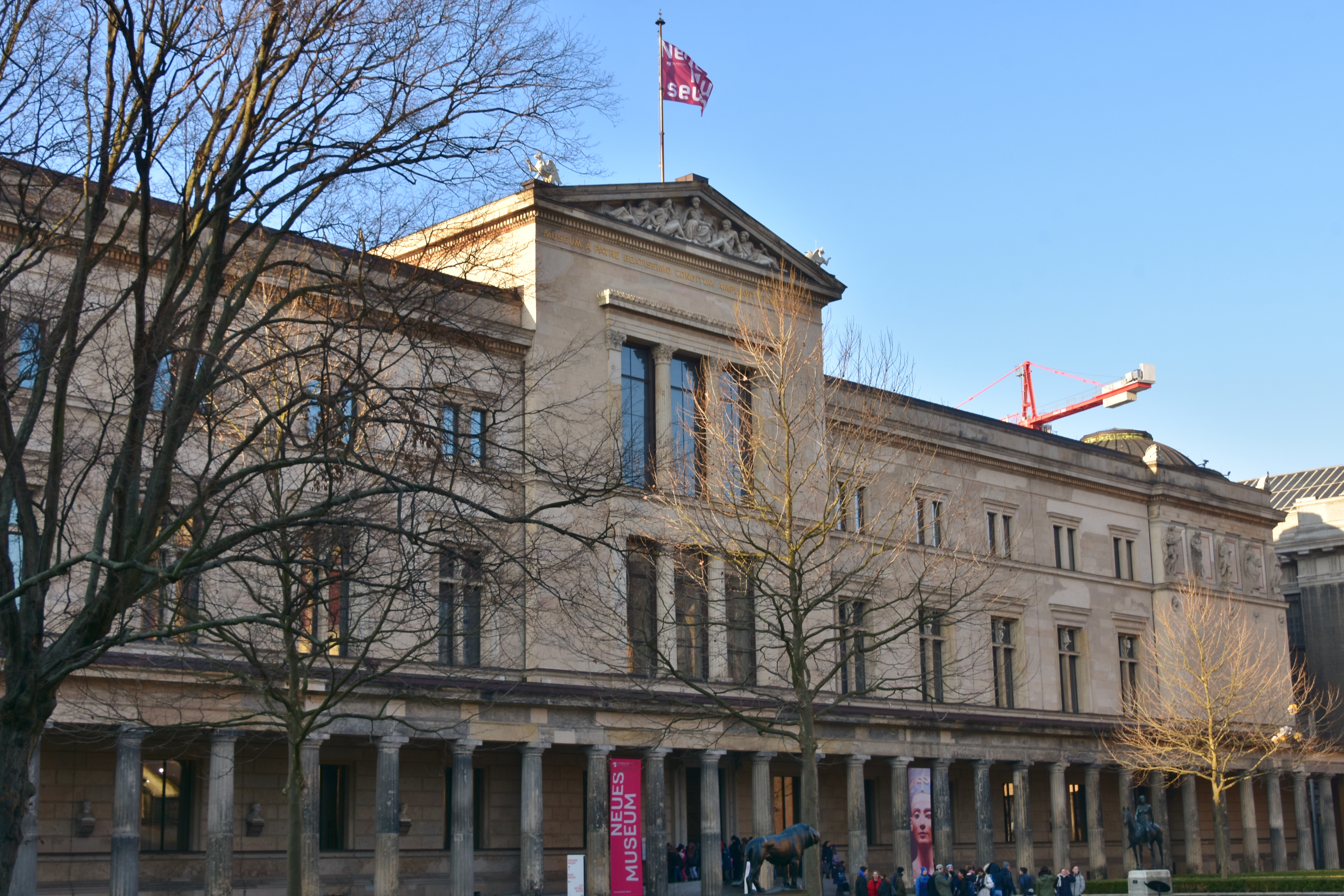
Neues Museum

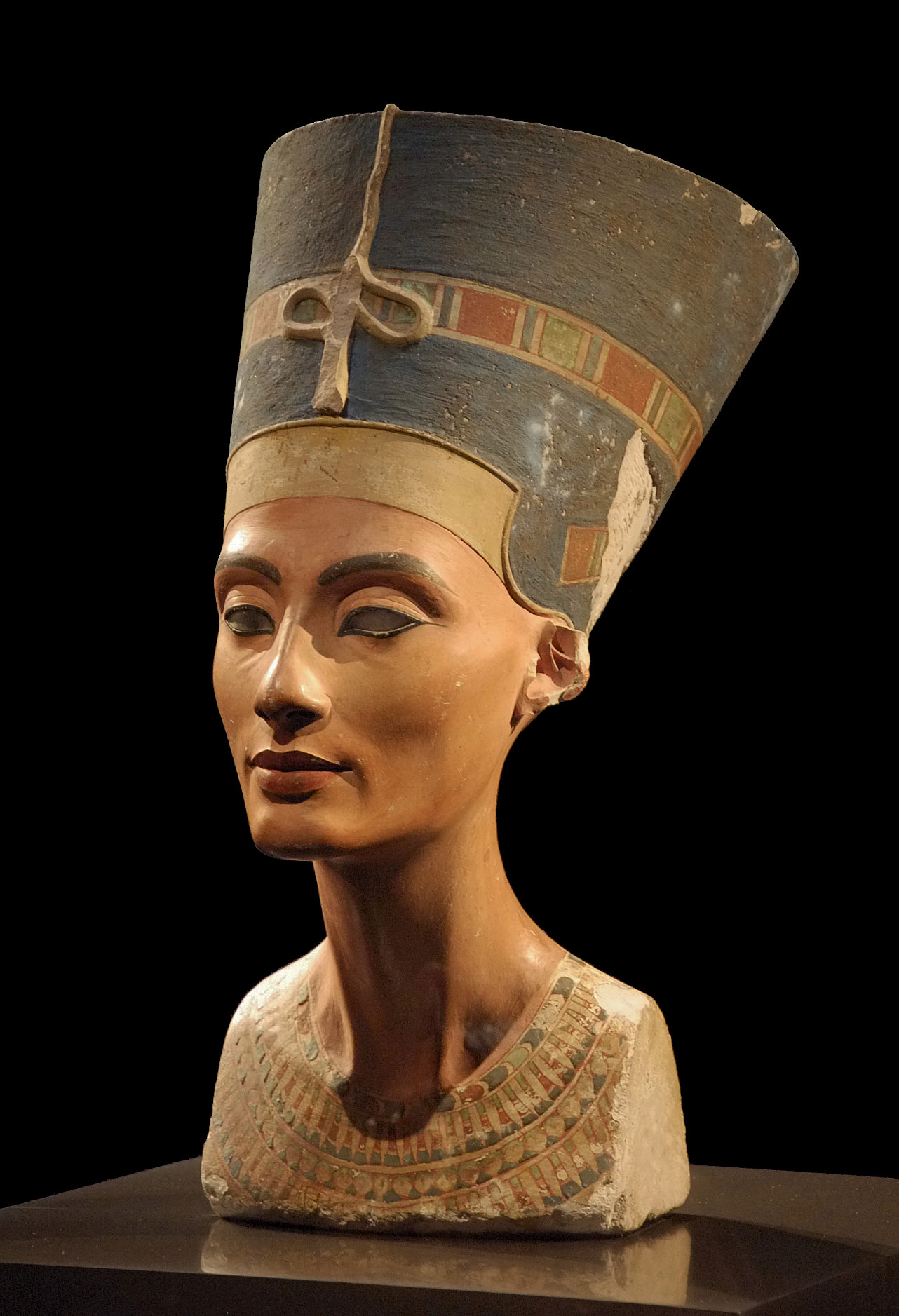
Nefertiti Bust

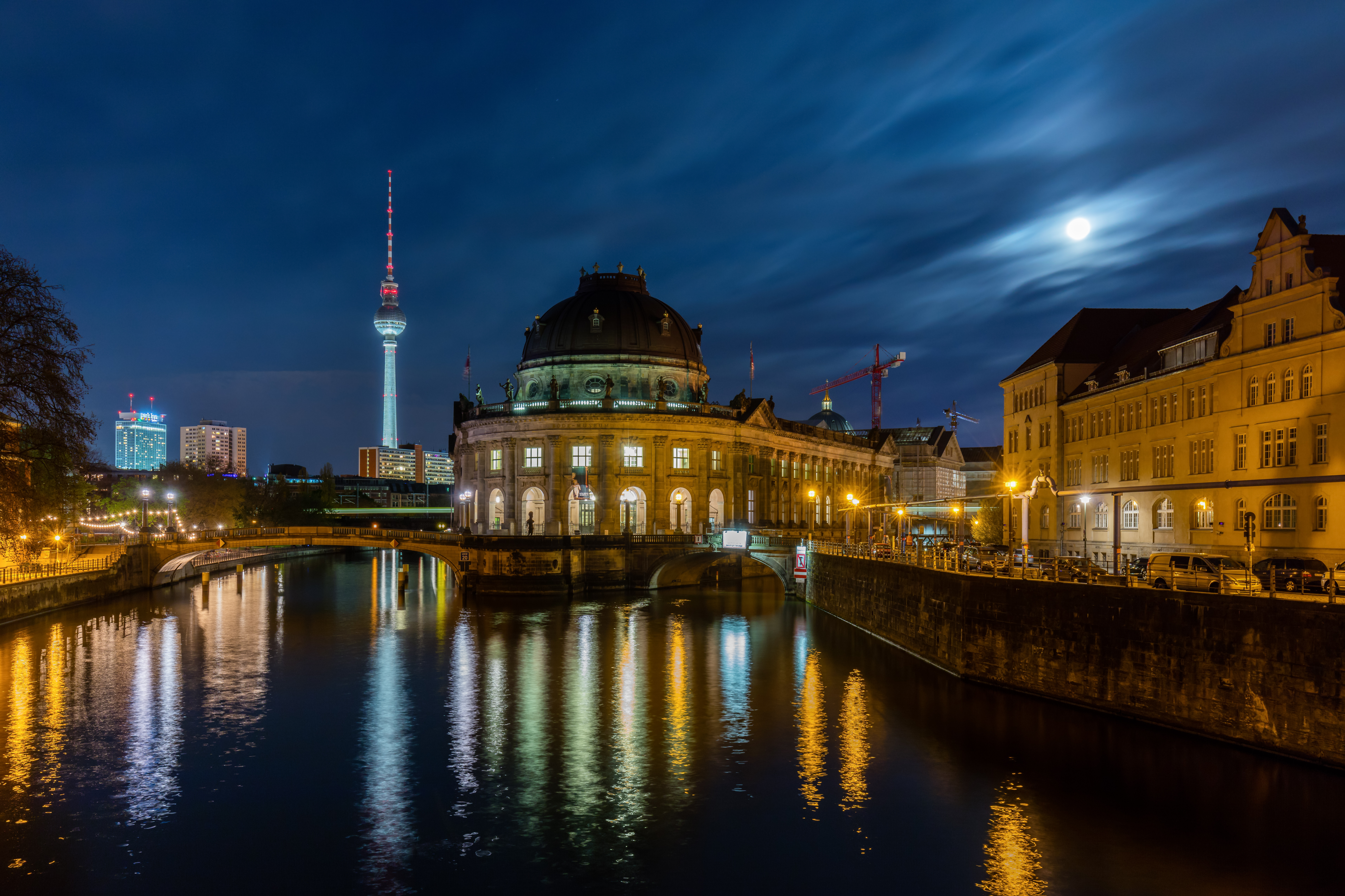
Bode Museum

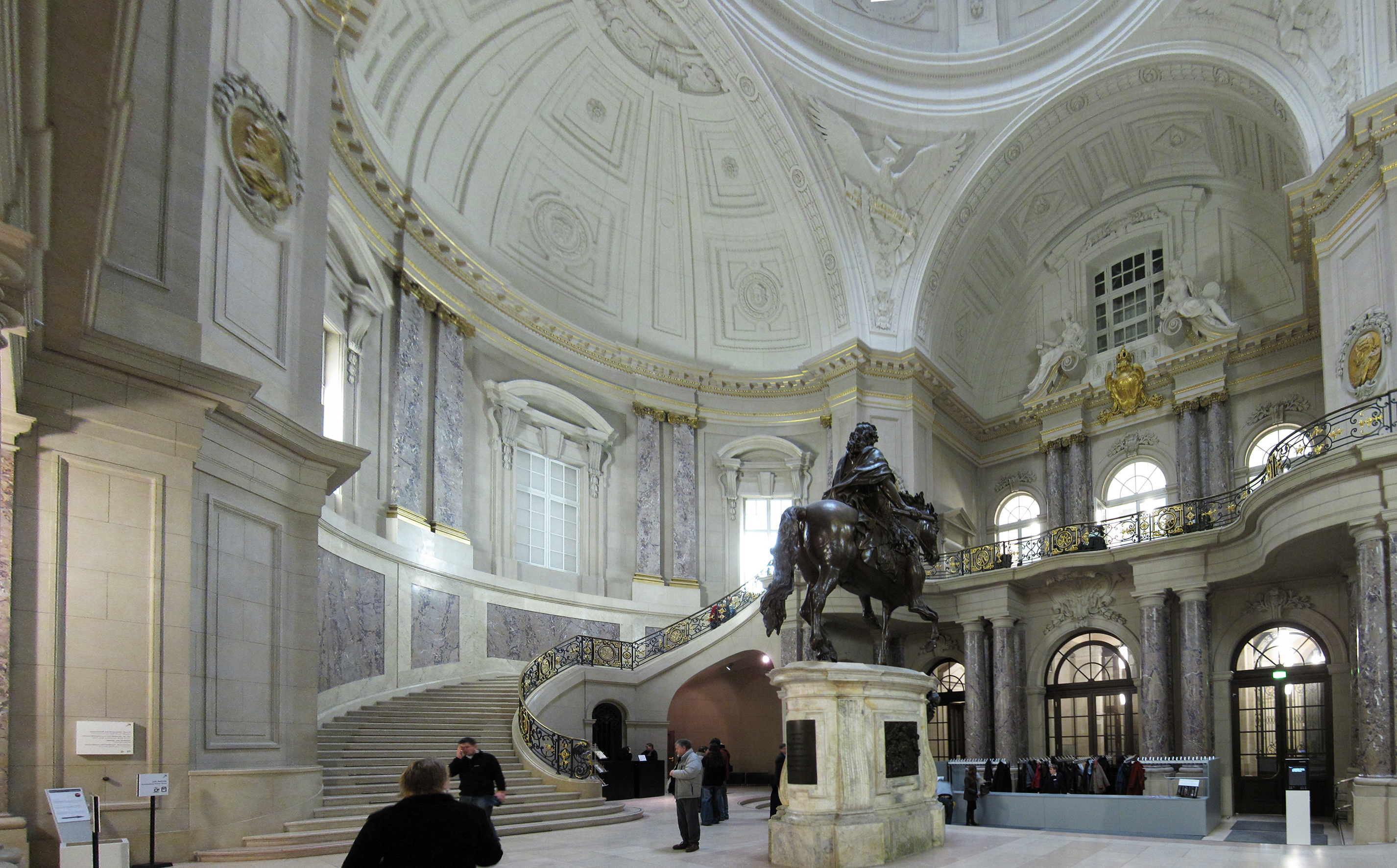
Bode Museum Lobby

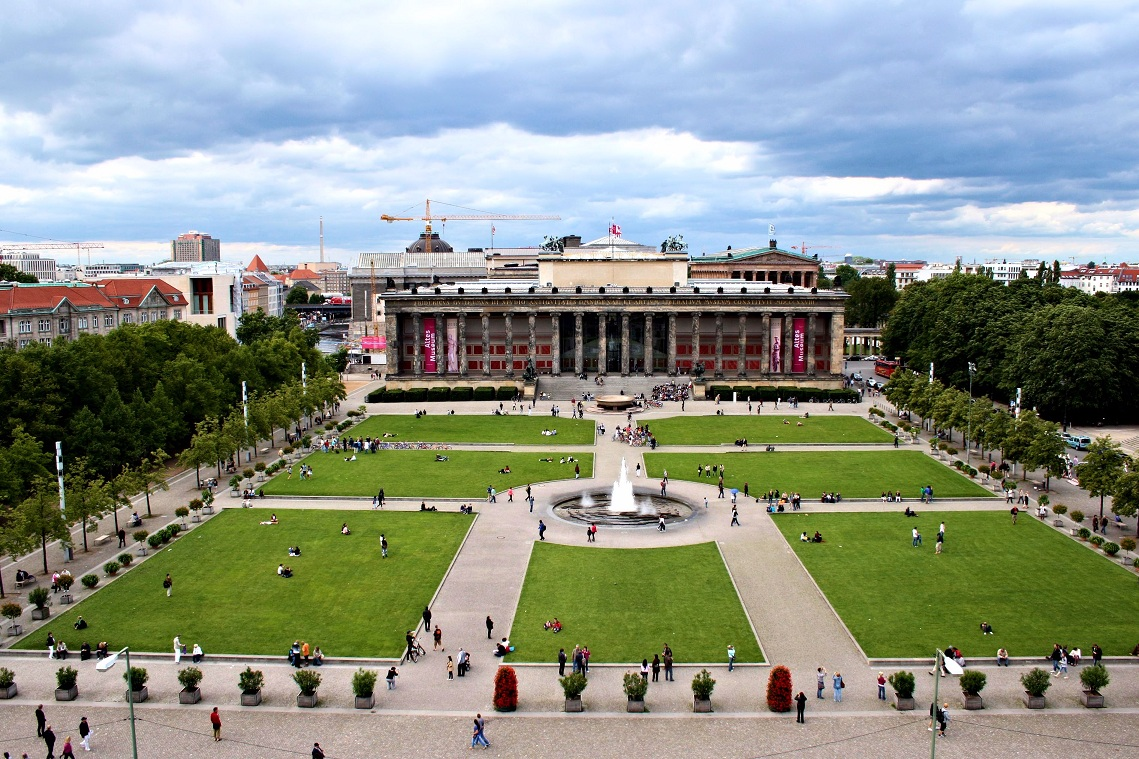
Altes Museum

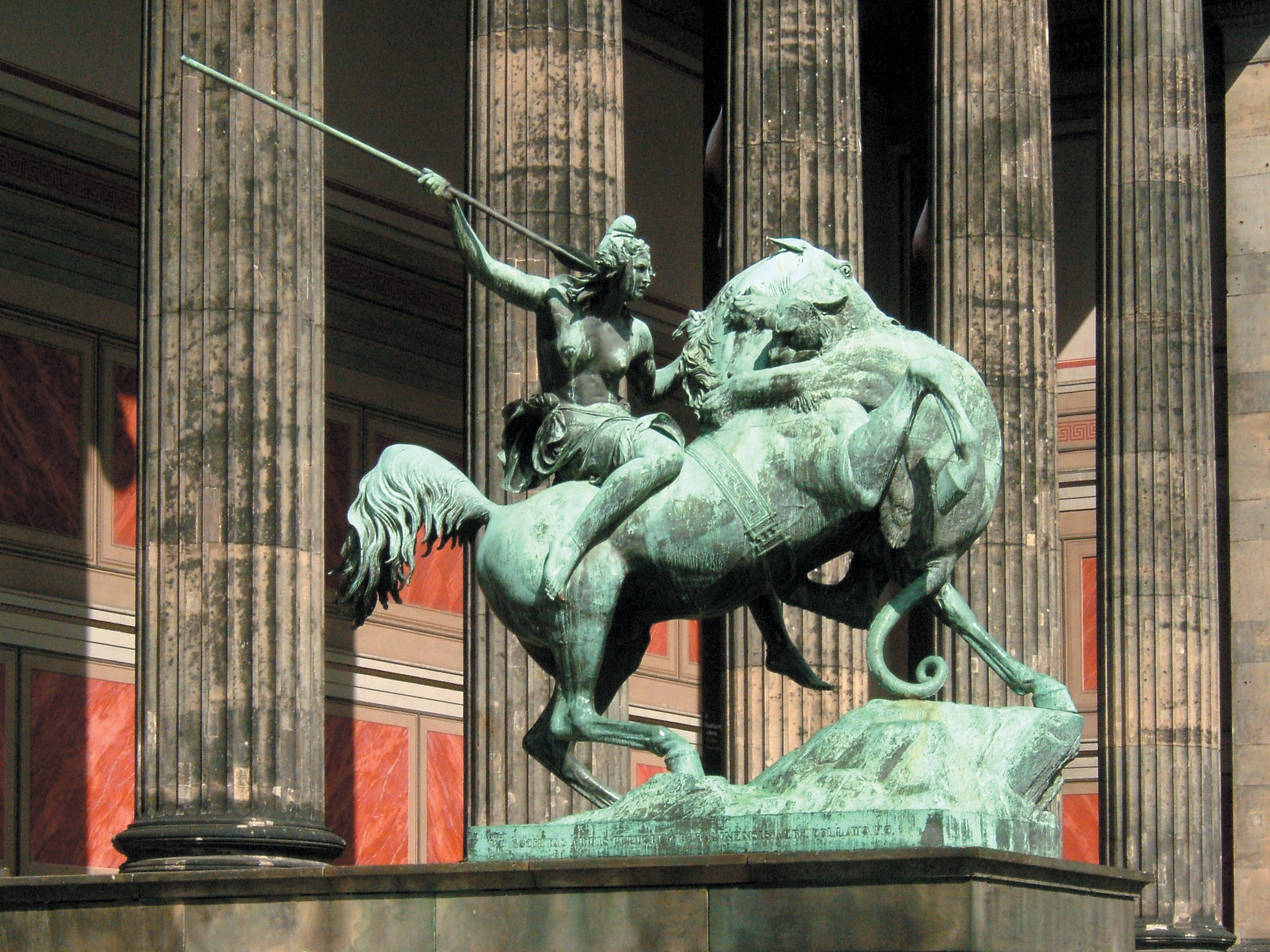
Statue at Altes Museum

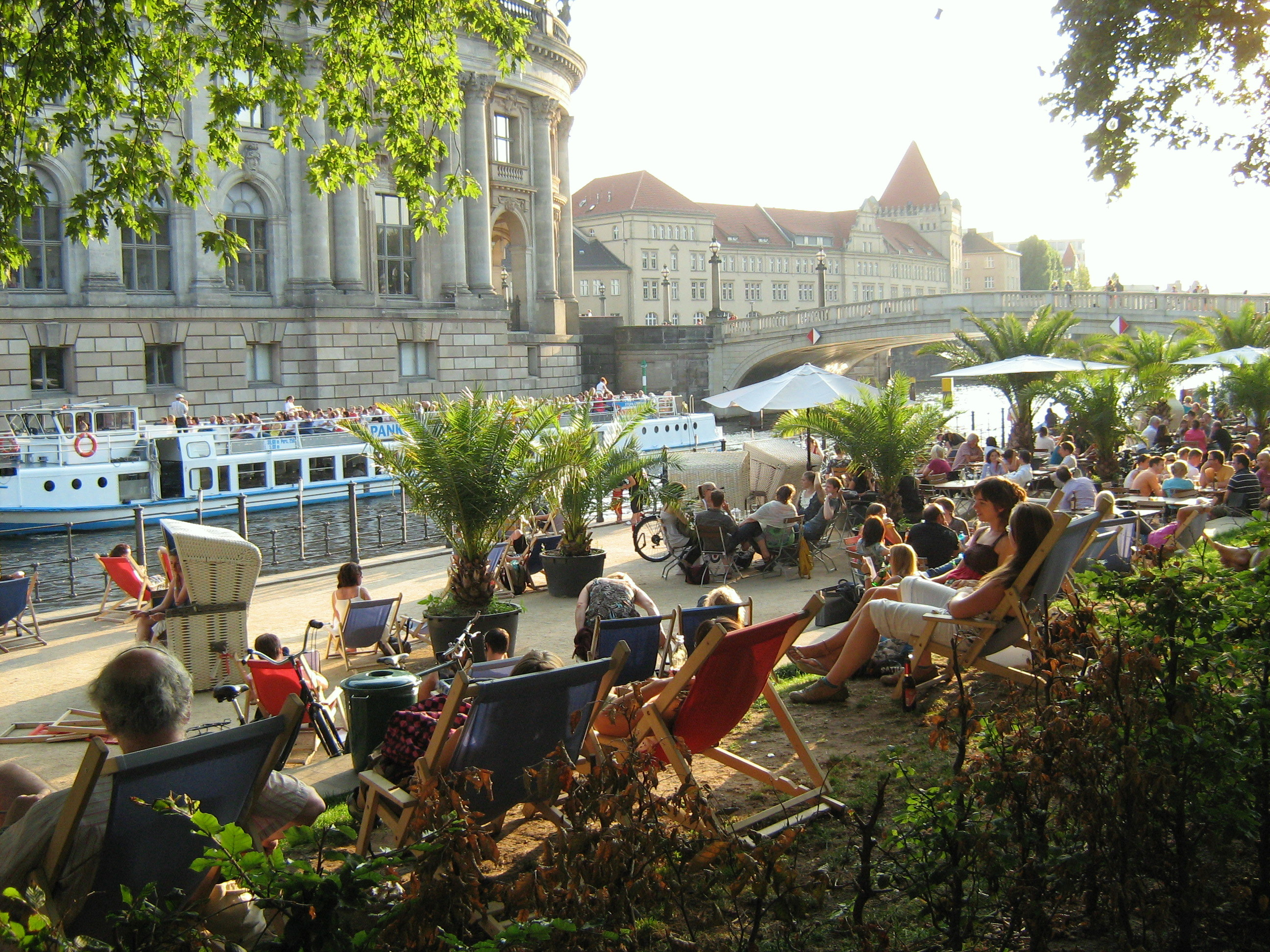
Beach at Museum Island

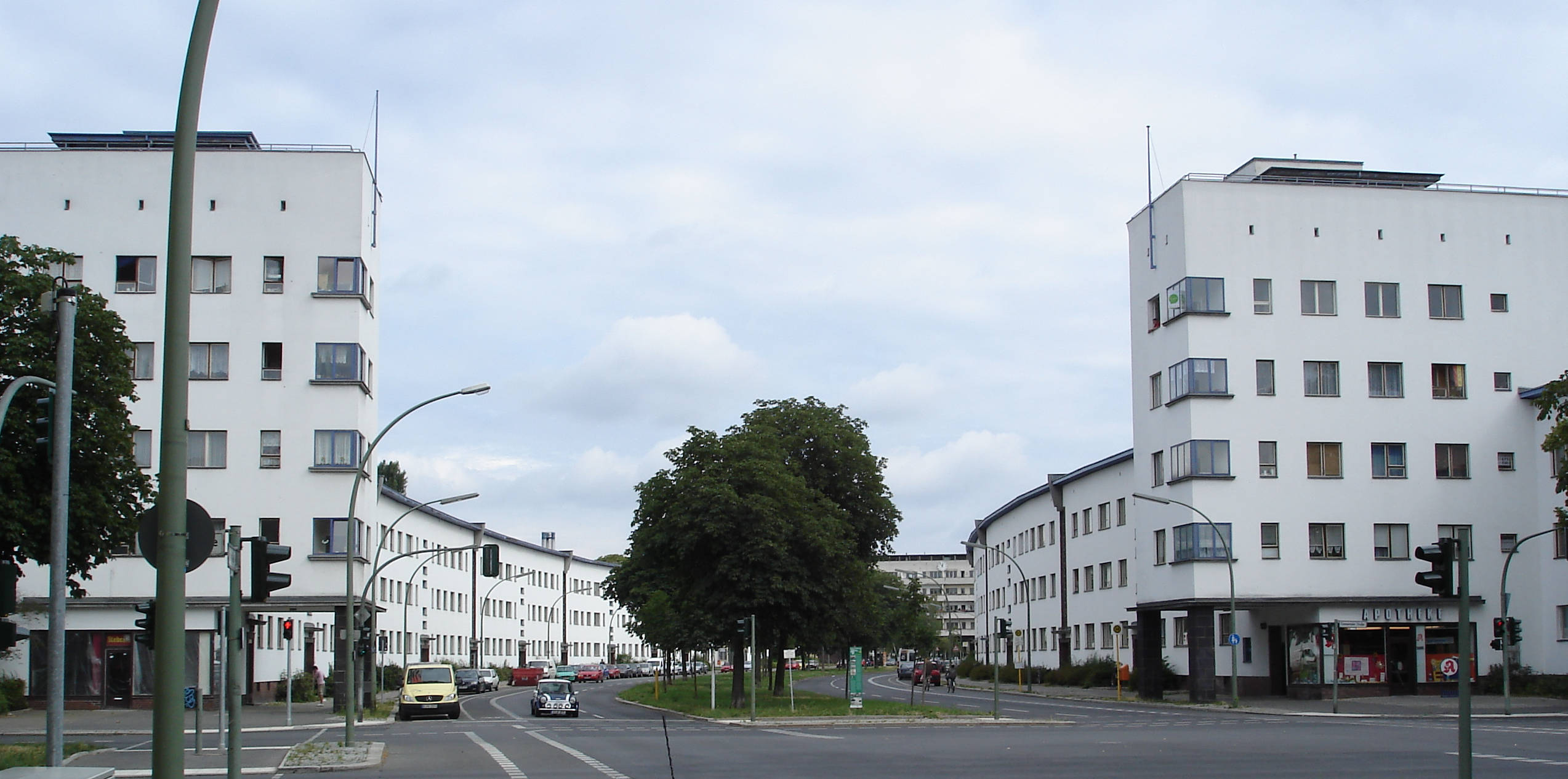
White City (1931)

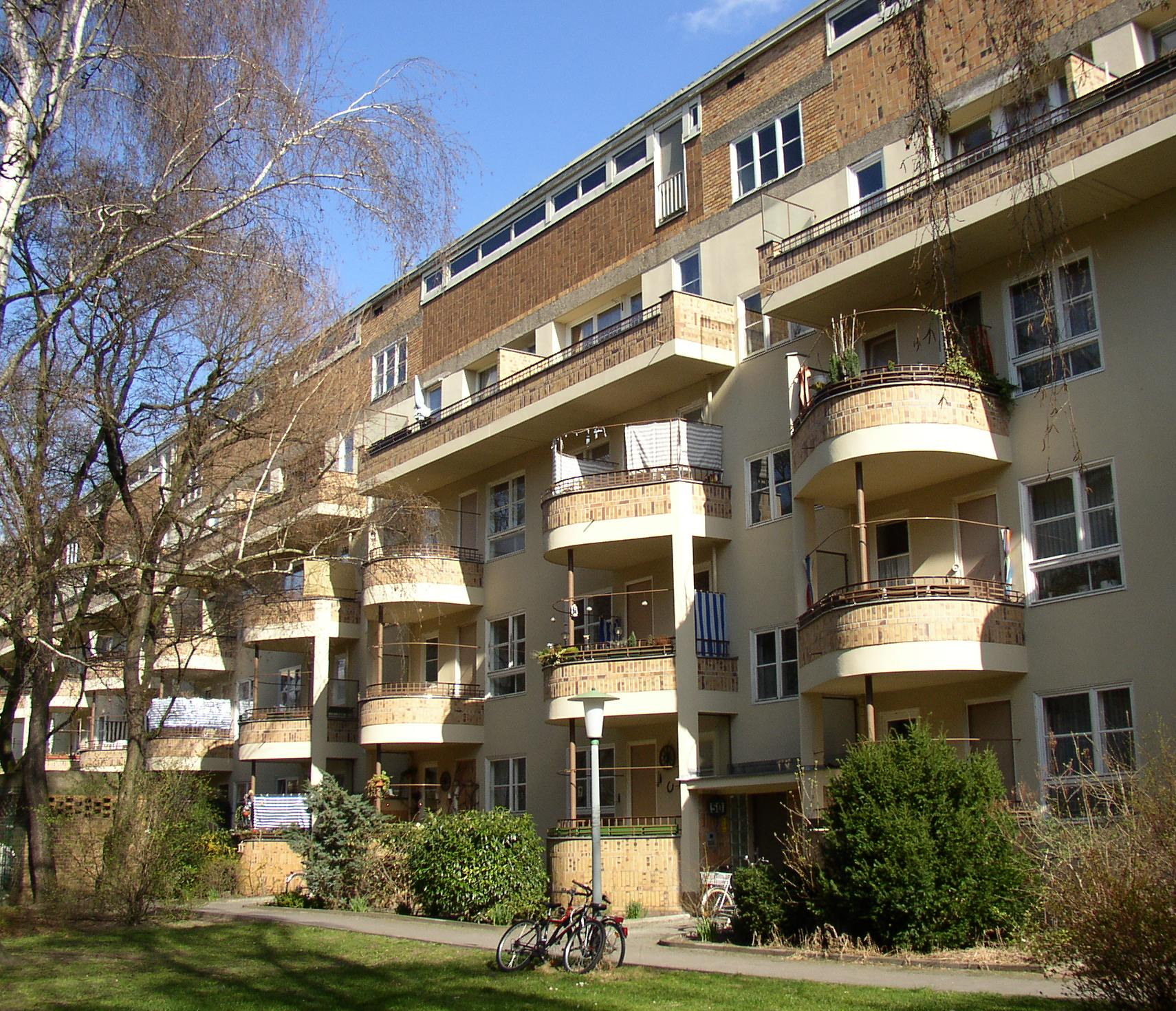
Berlin Modernism Housing Estates

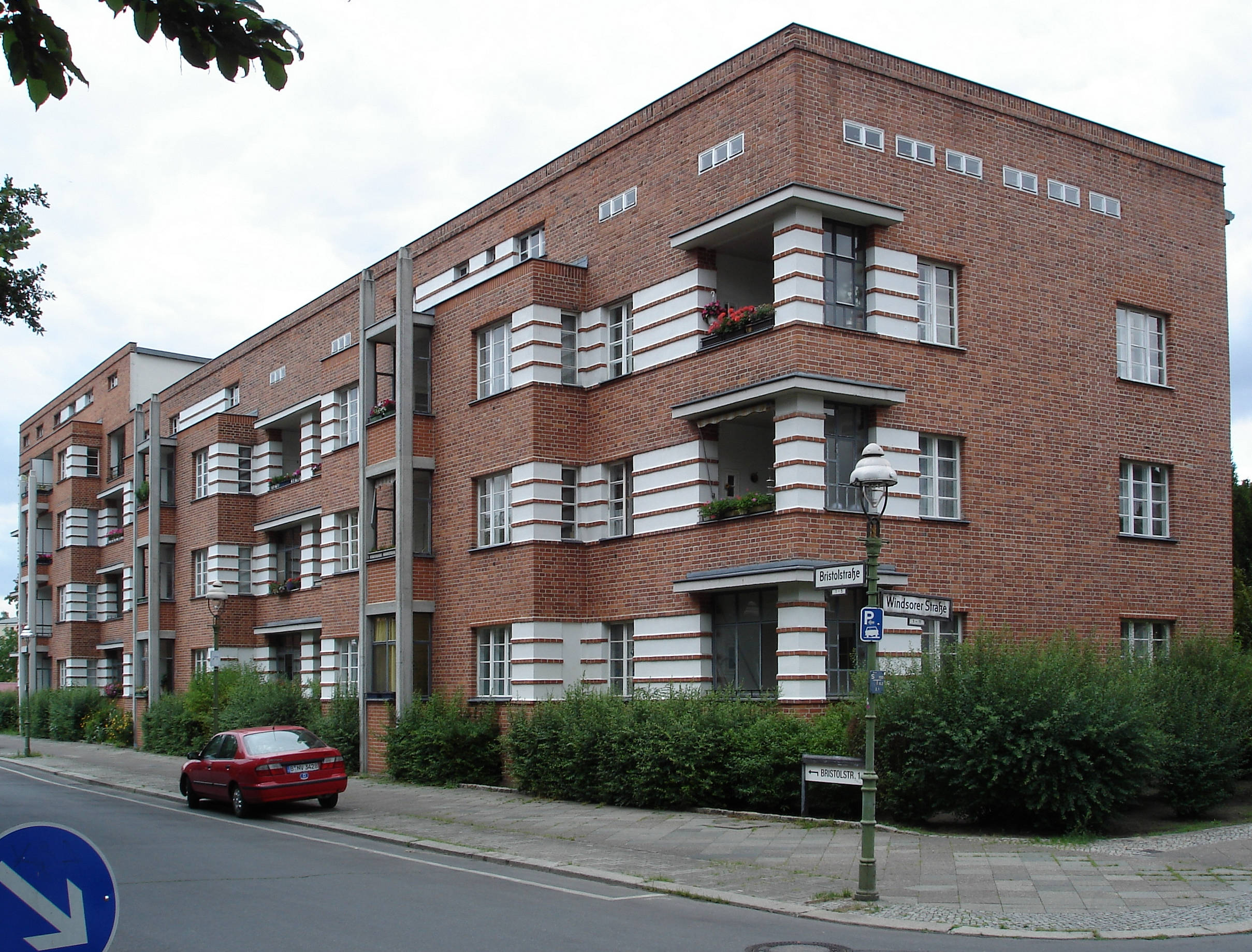
Schillerpark Estate (1930)

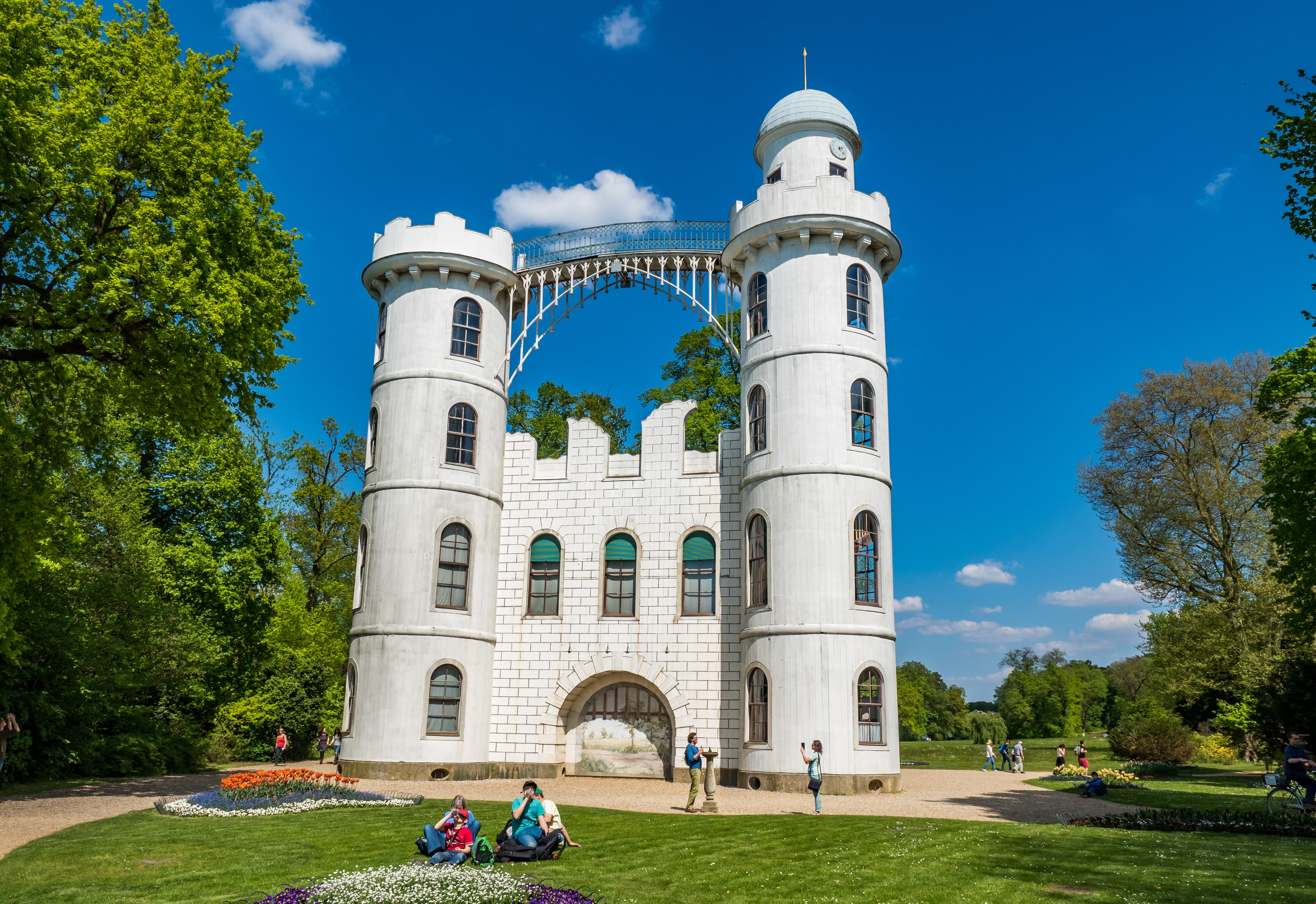
Pfaueninsel

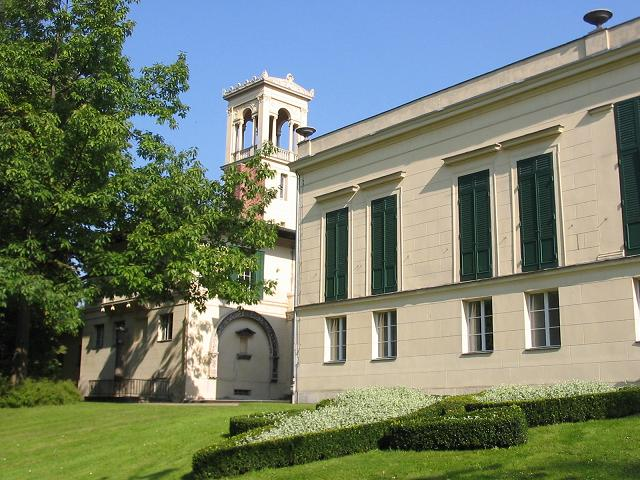
Glienicke Palace

== Capital buildings ==
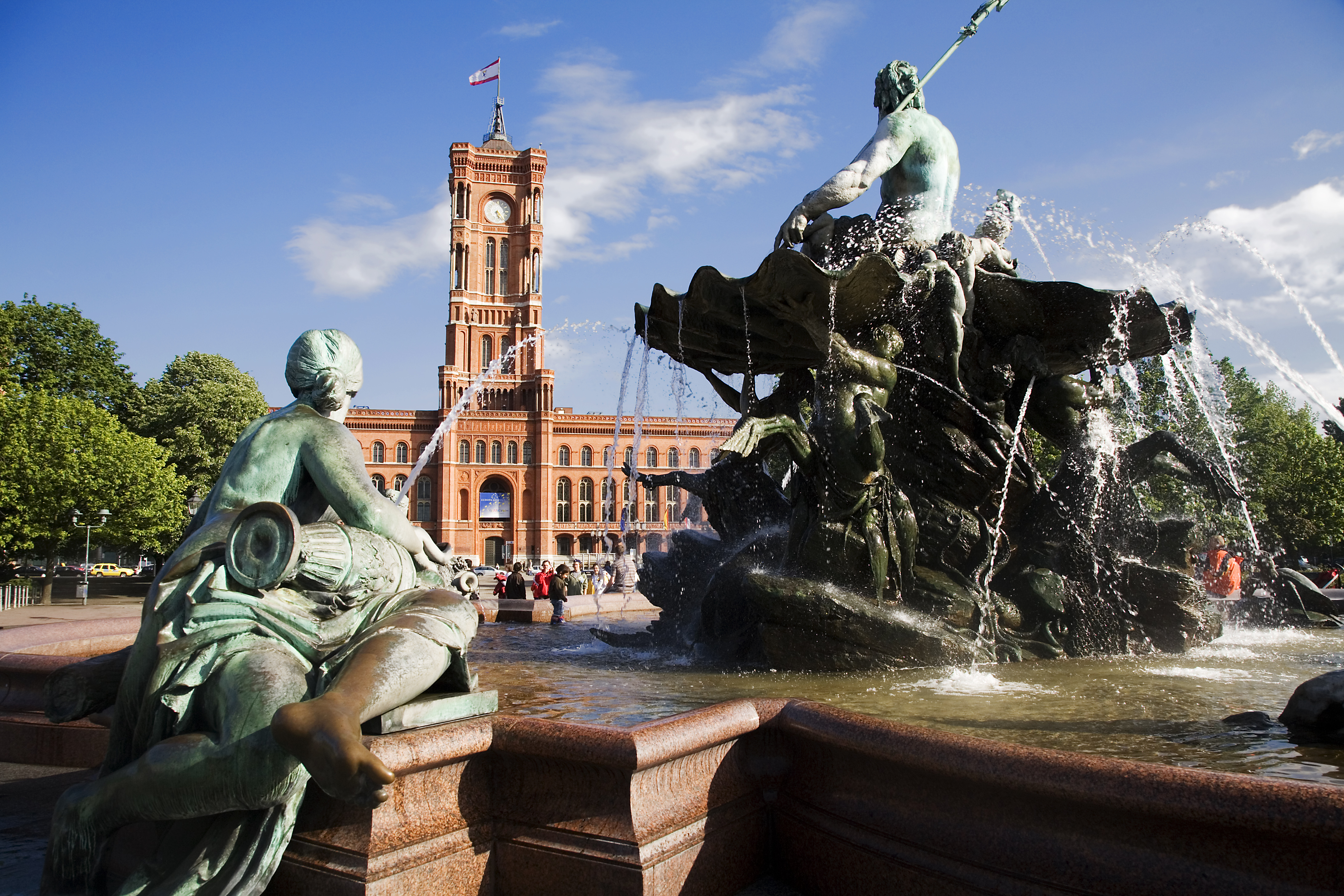
Rotes Rathaus (City Hall) and Neptune Fountain

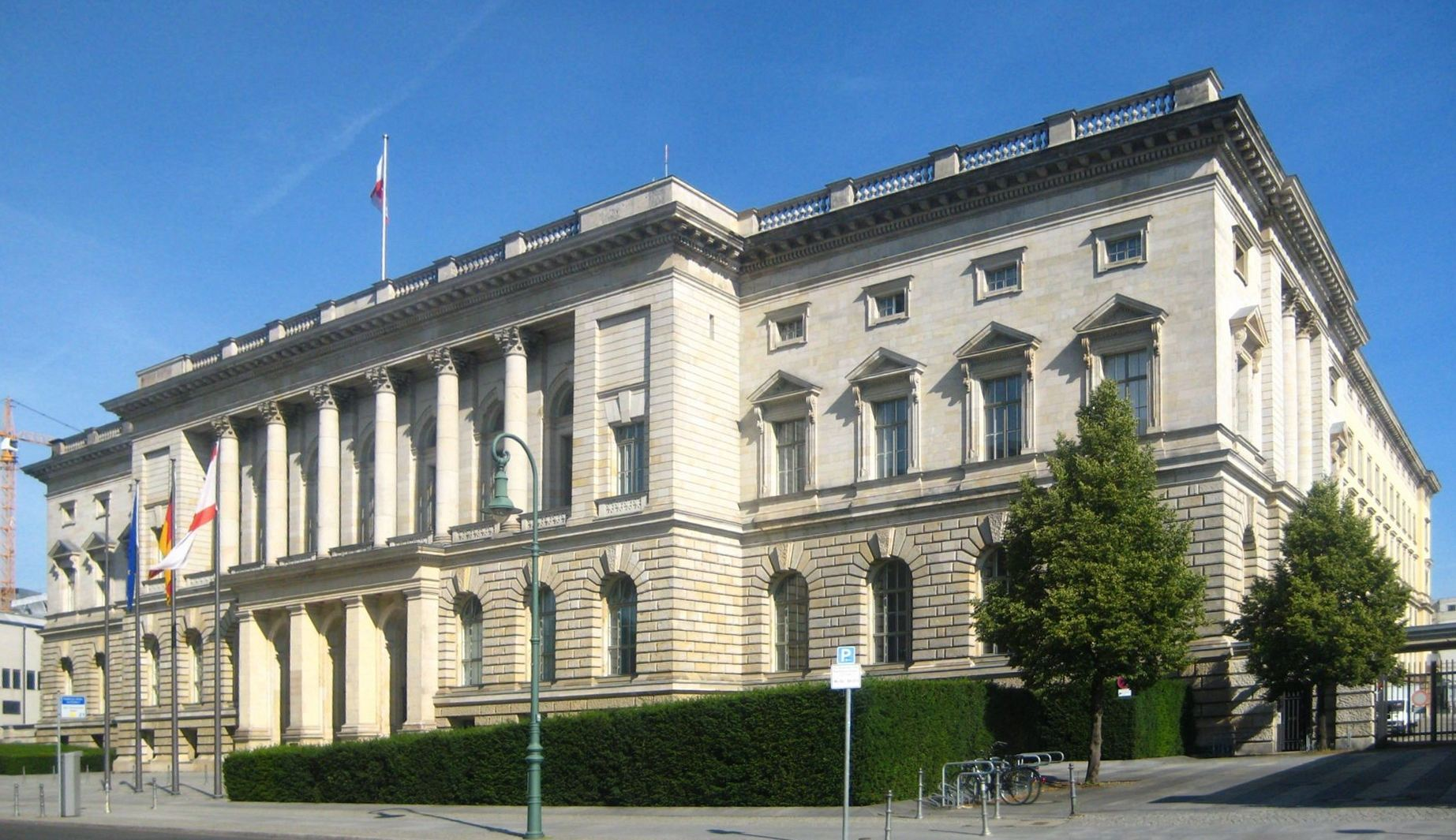
Abgeordnetenhaus (City parliament)

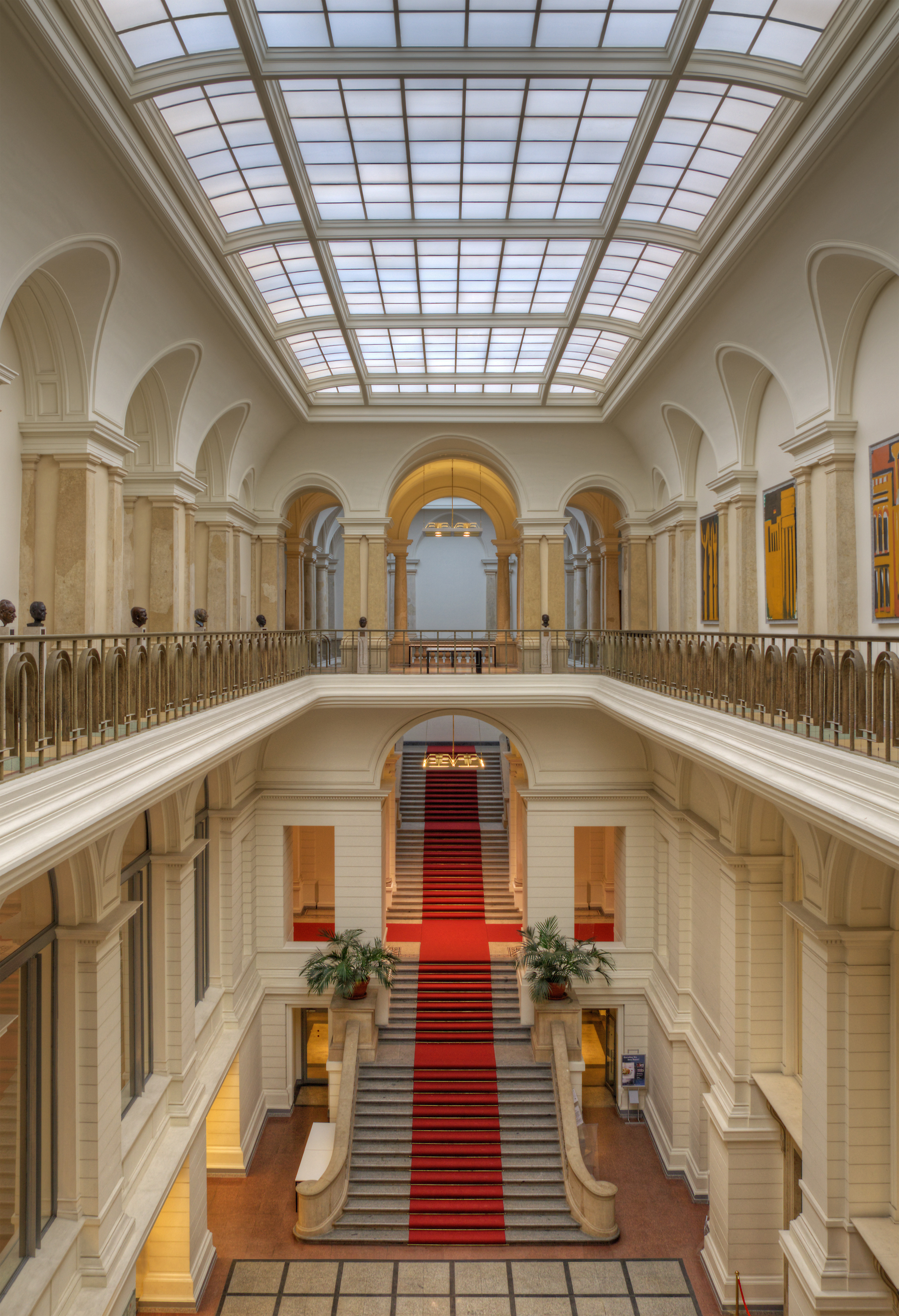
Abgeordnetenhaus (Interior)

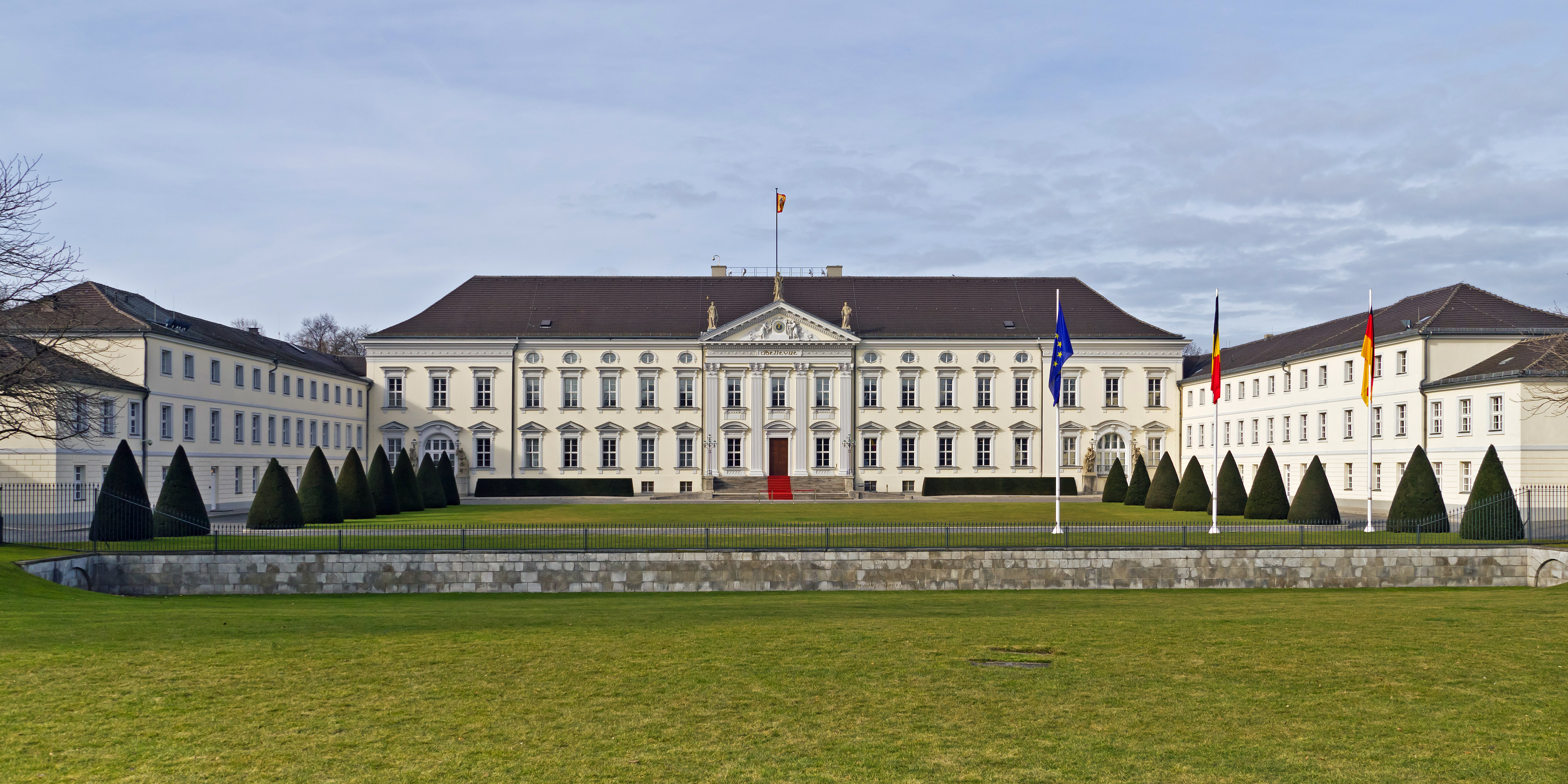
Bellevue Palace (Seat of German President)

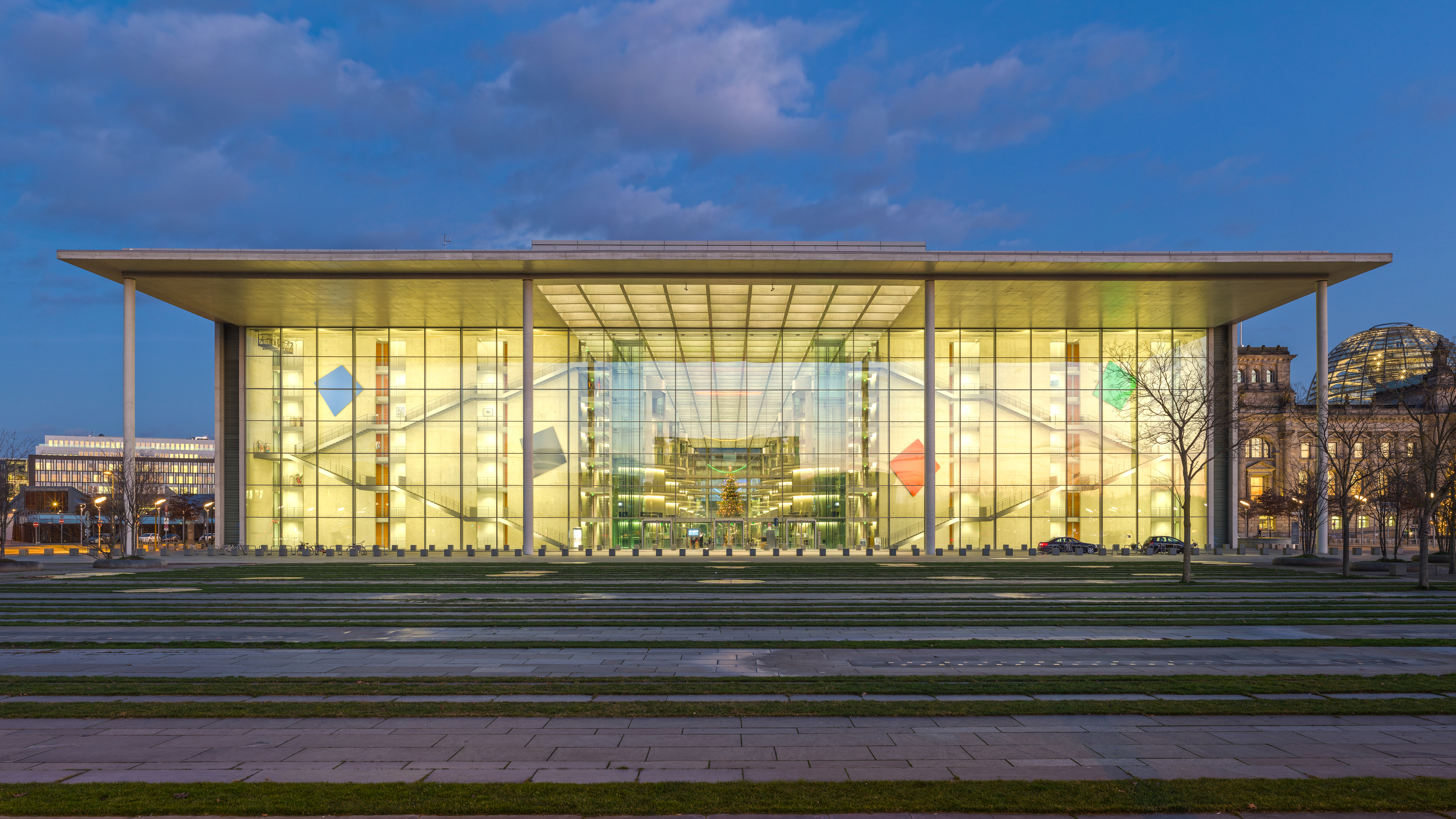
Paul Löbe Haus

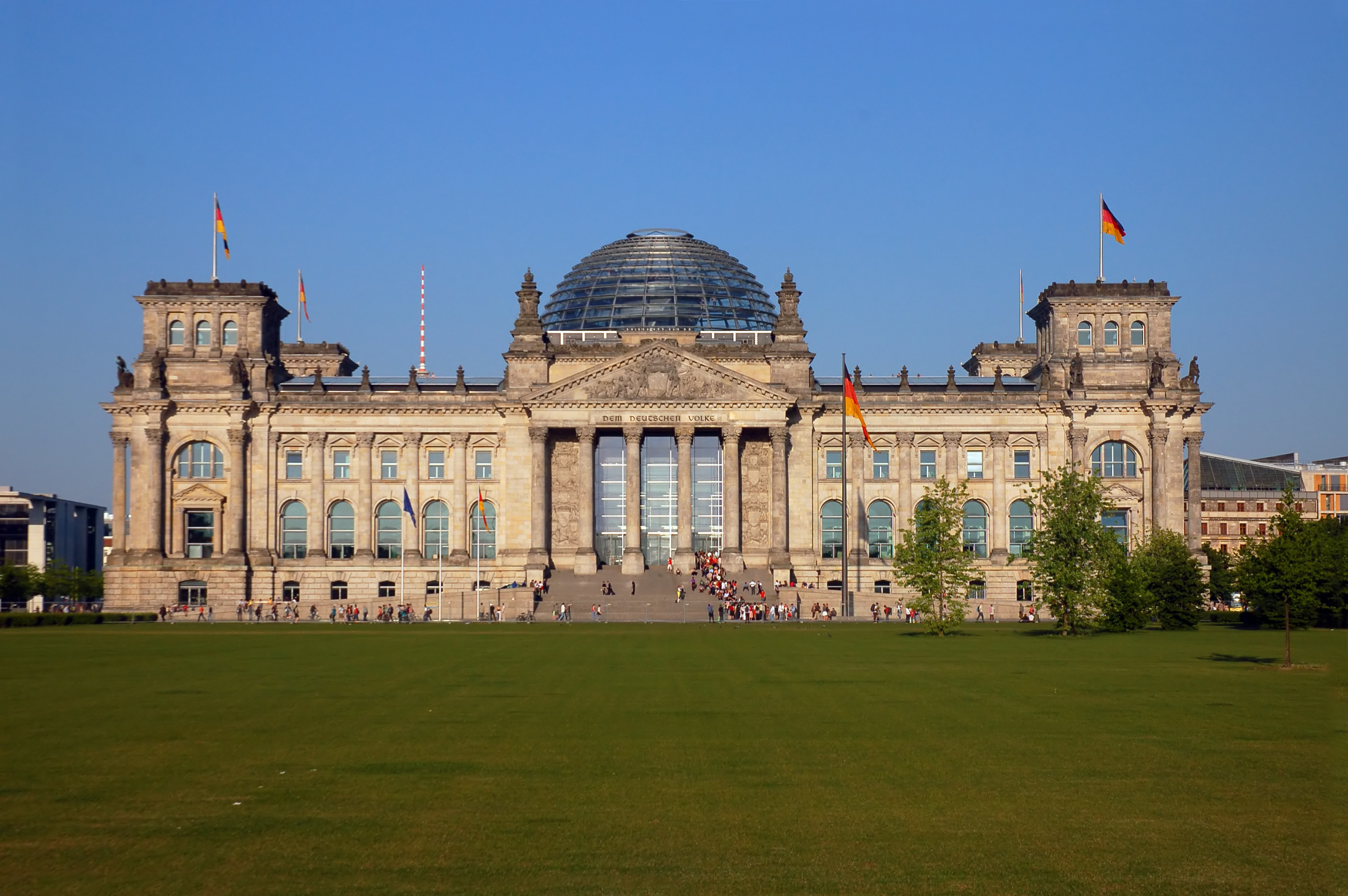
Reichstag building (German parliament)

Reichstag dome _{(inside)}

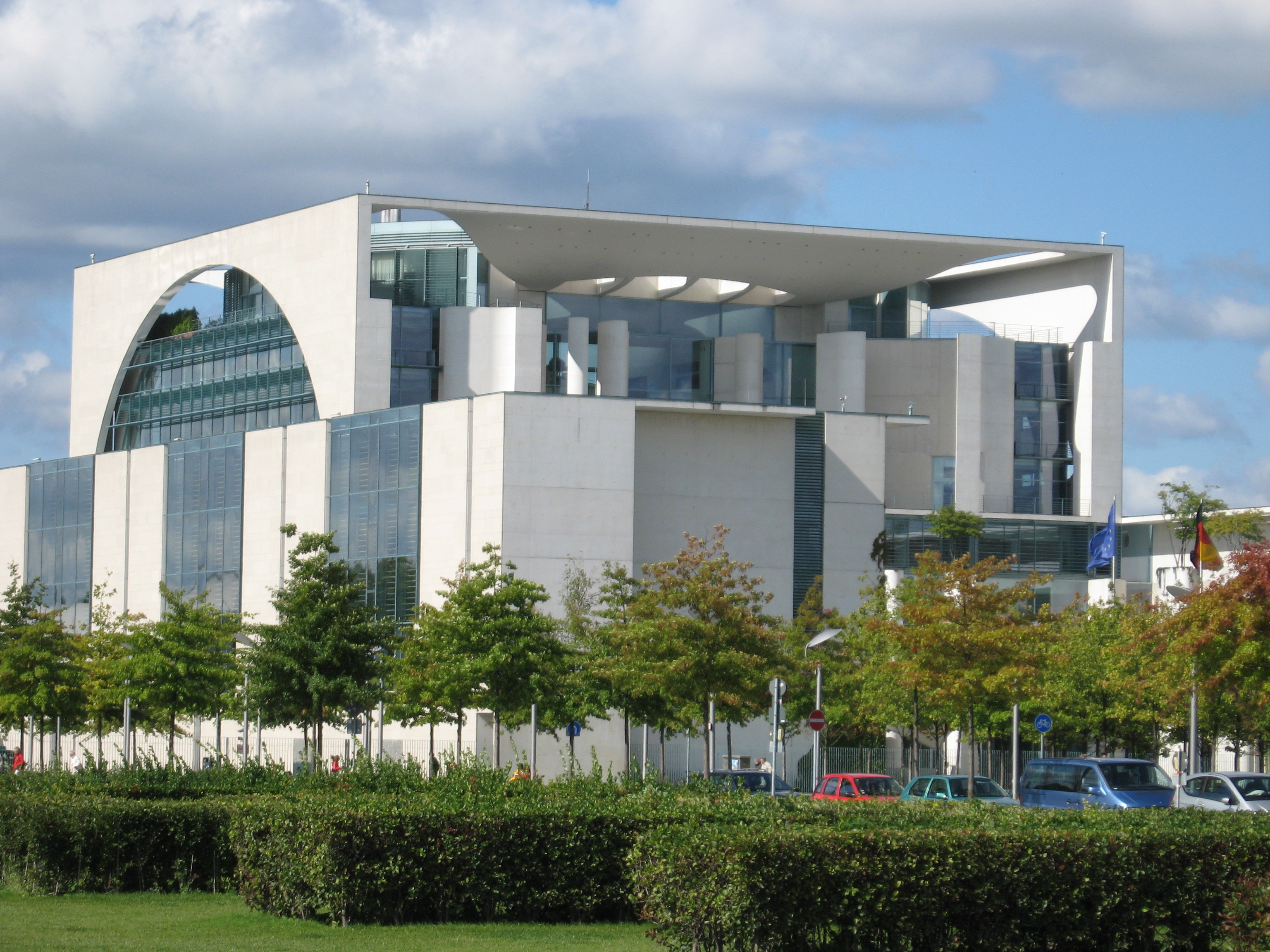
Bundeskanzleramt German Chancellery

Marie-Elisabeth-Lüders-Haus

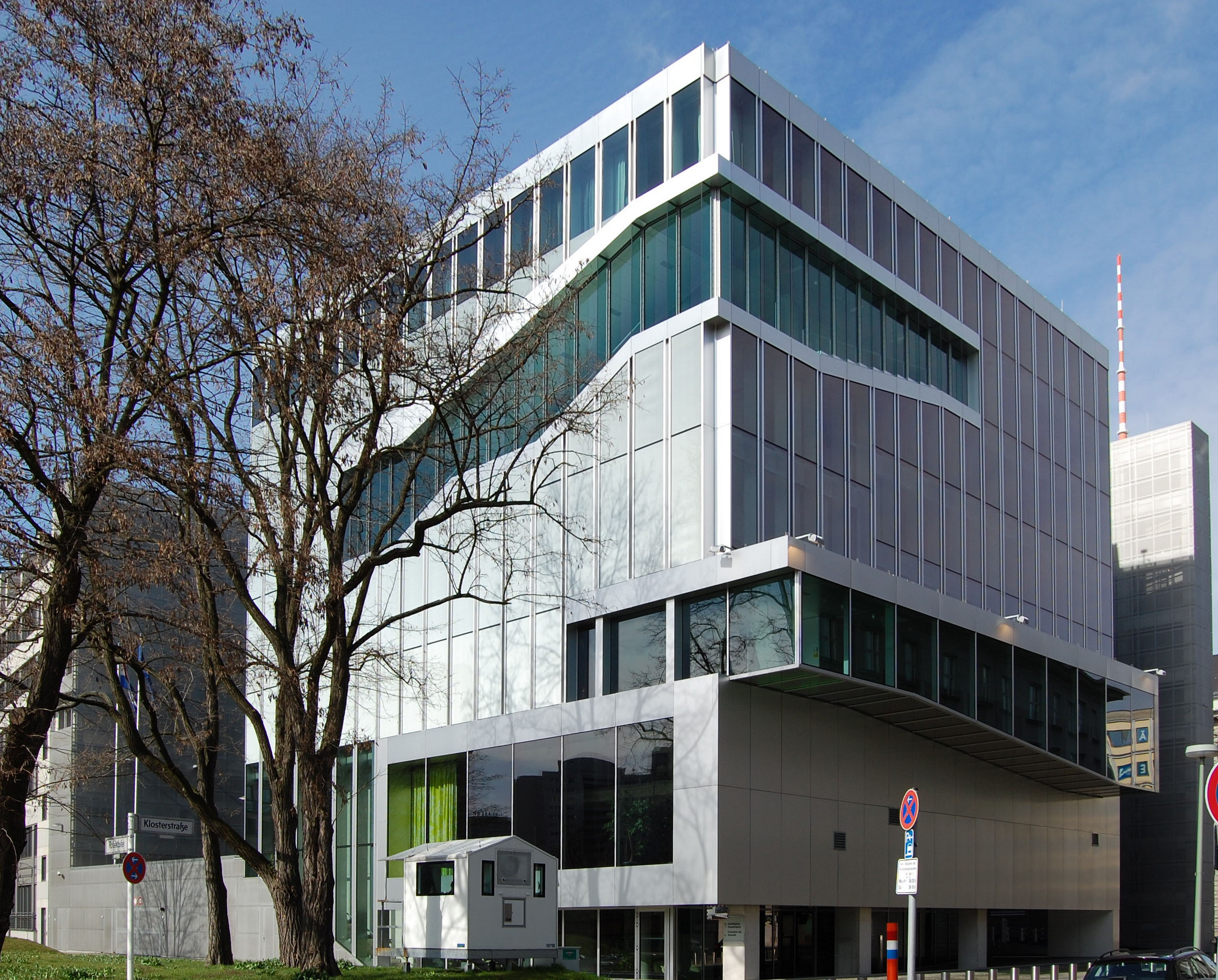
Dutch Embassy

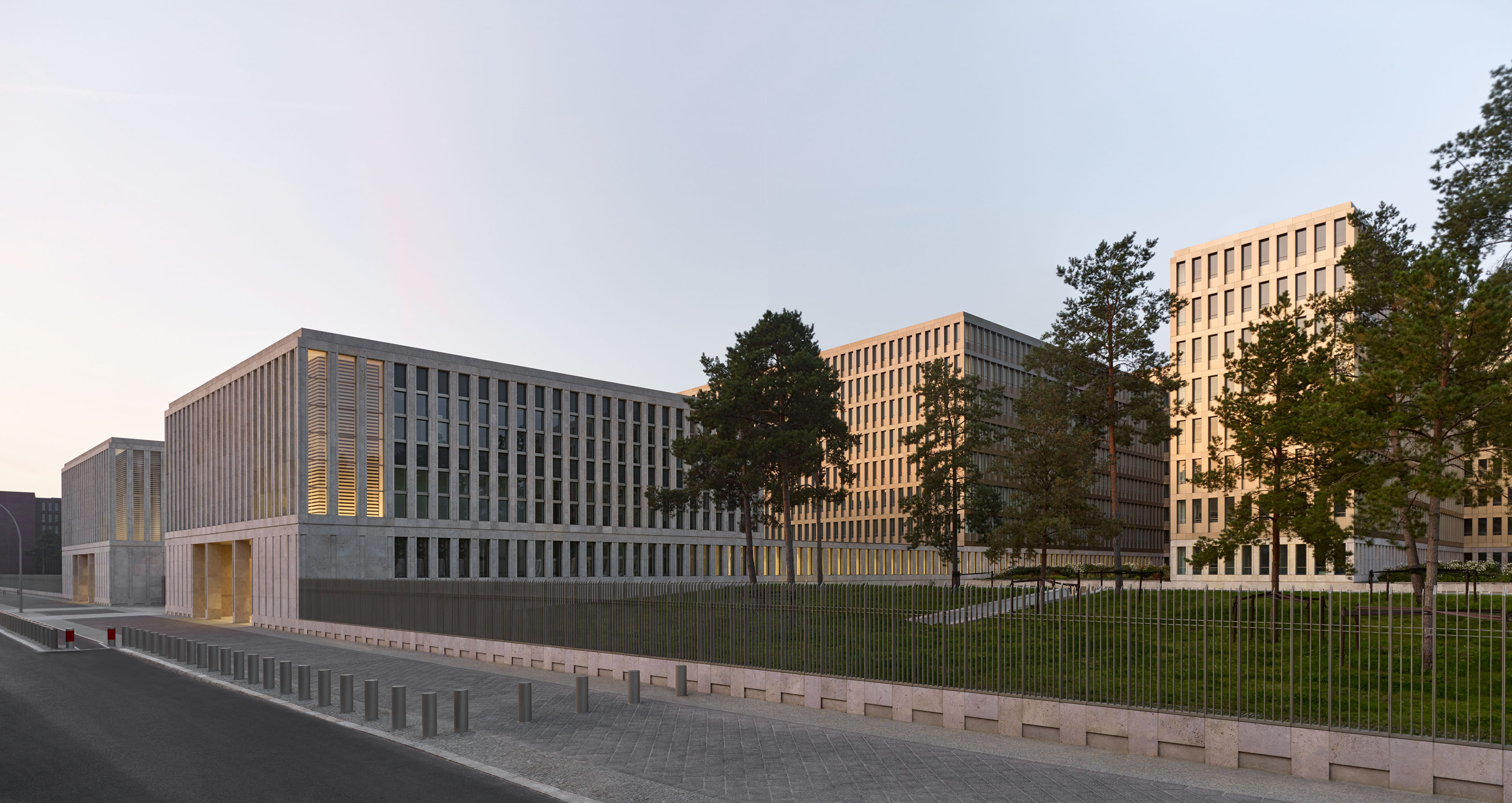
BND Building

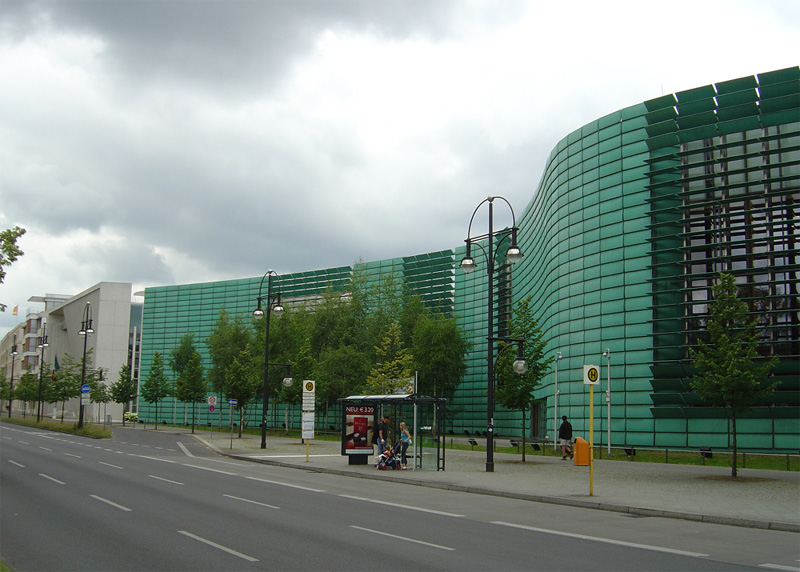
Nordic Embassies

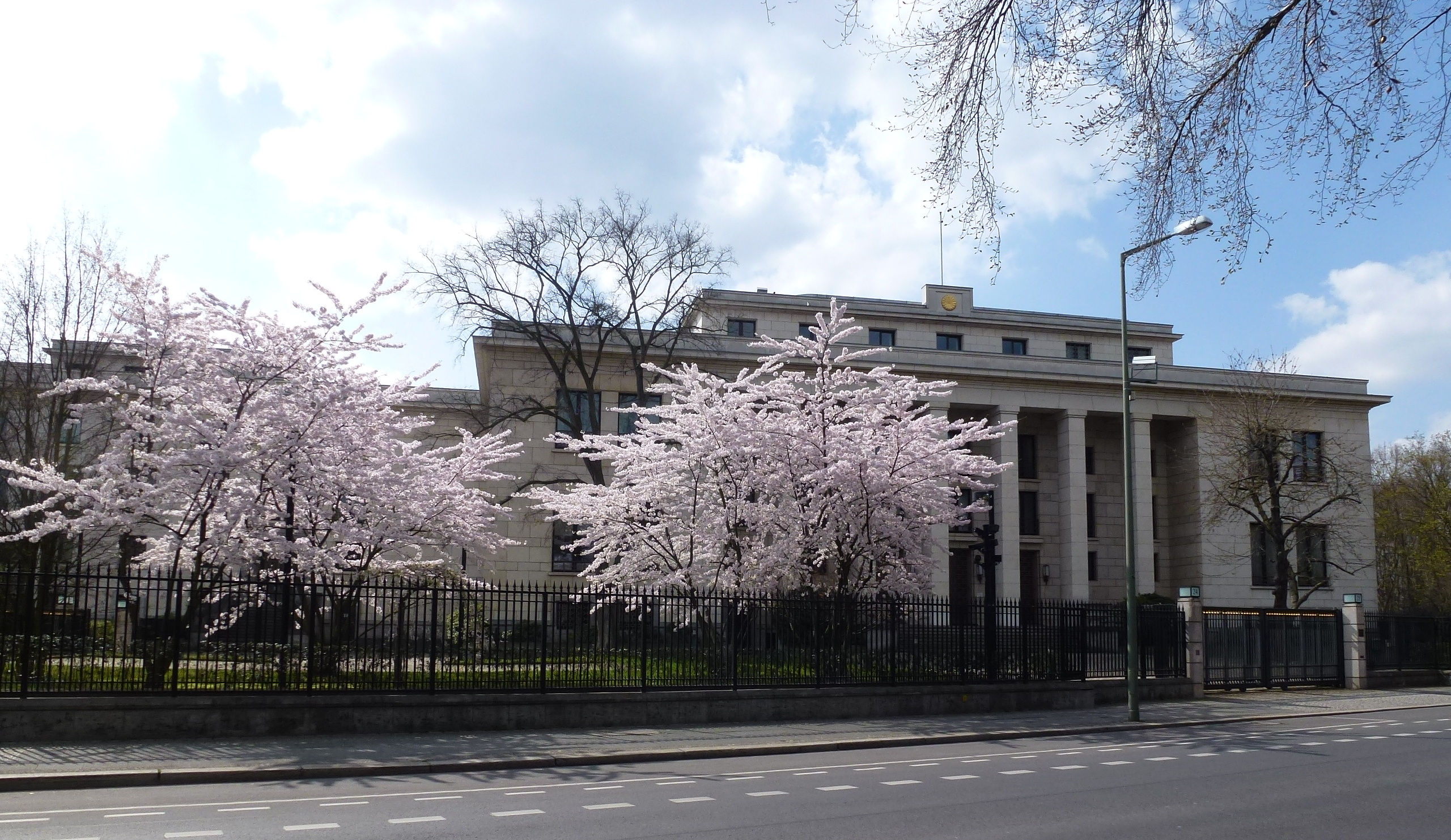
Japanese Embassy

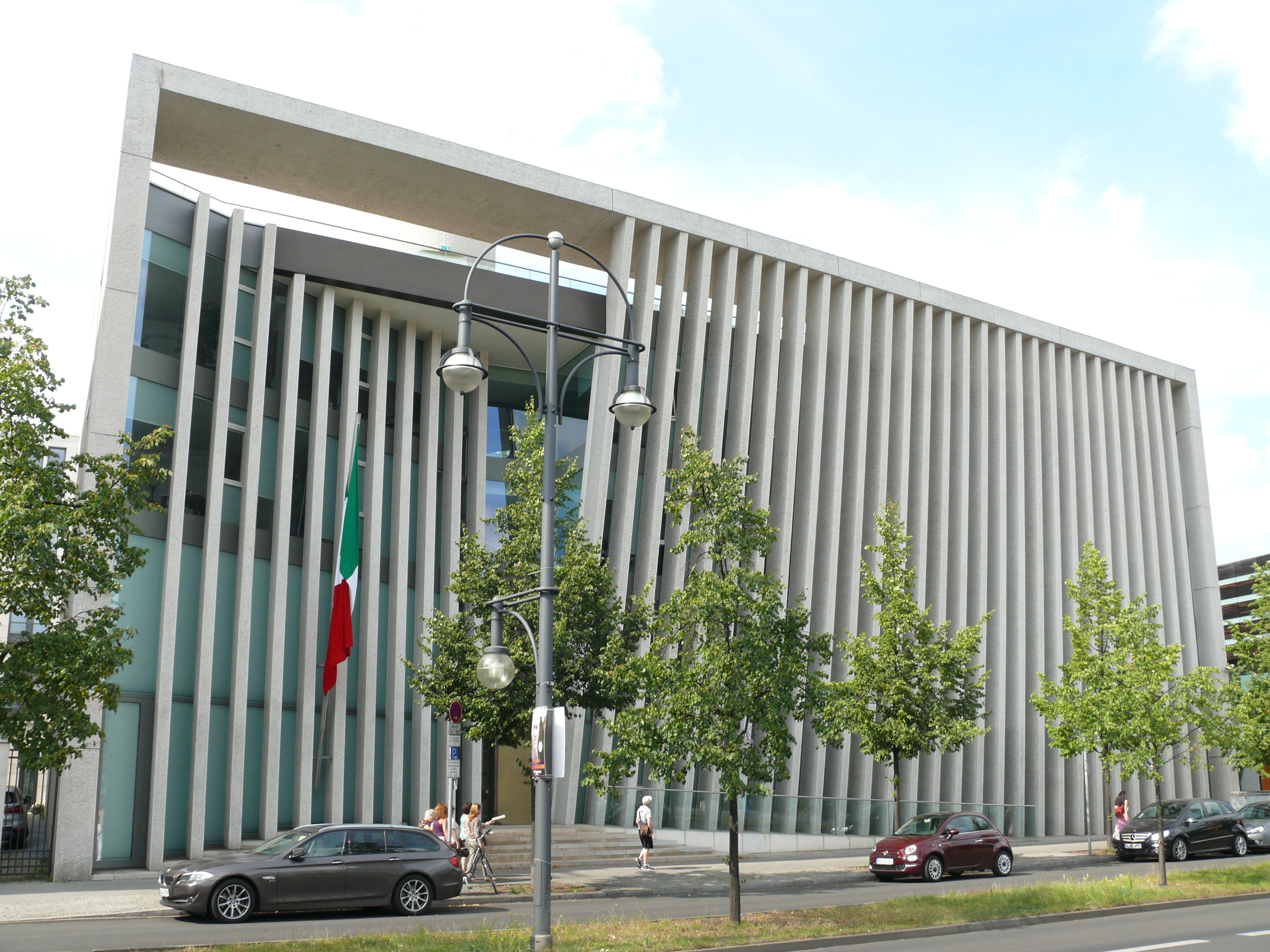
Mexican Embassy

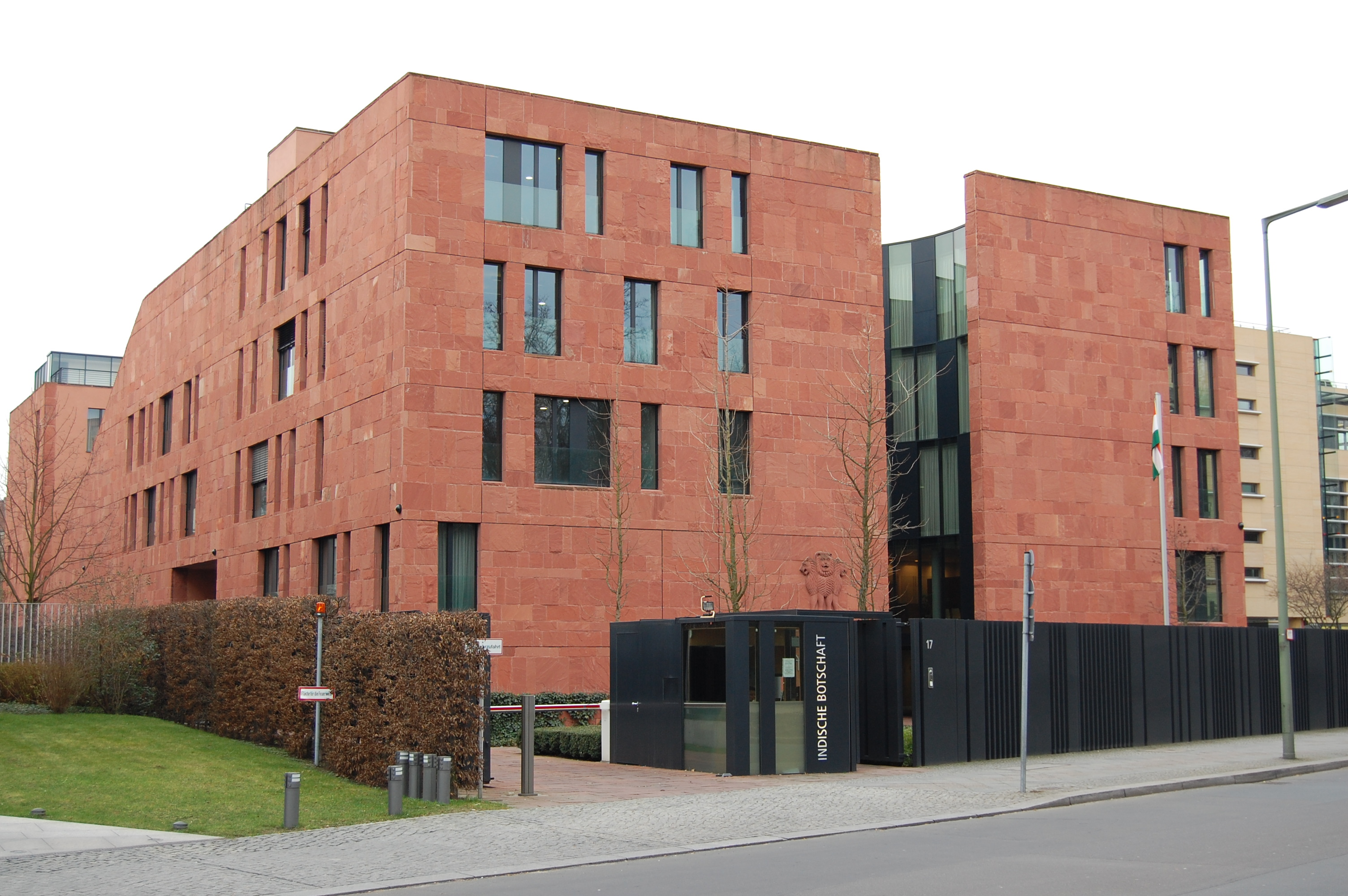
Indian Embassy

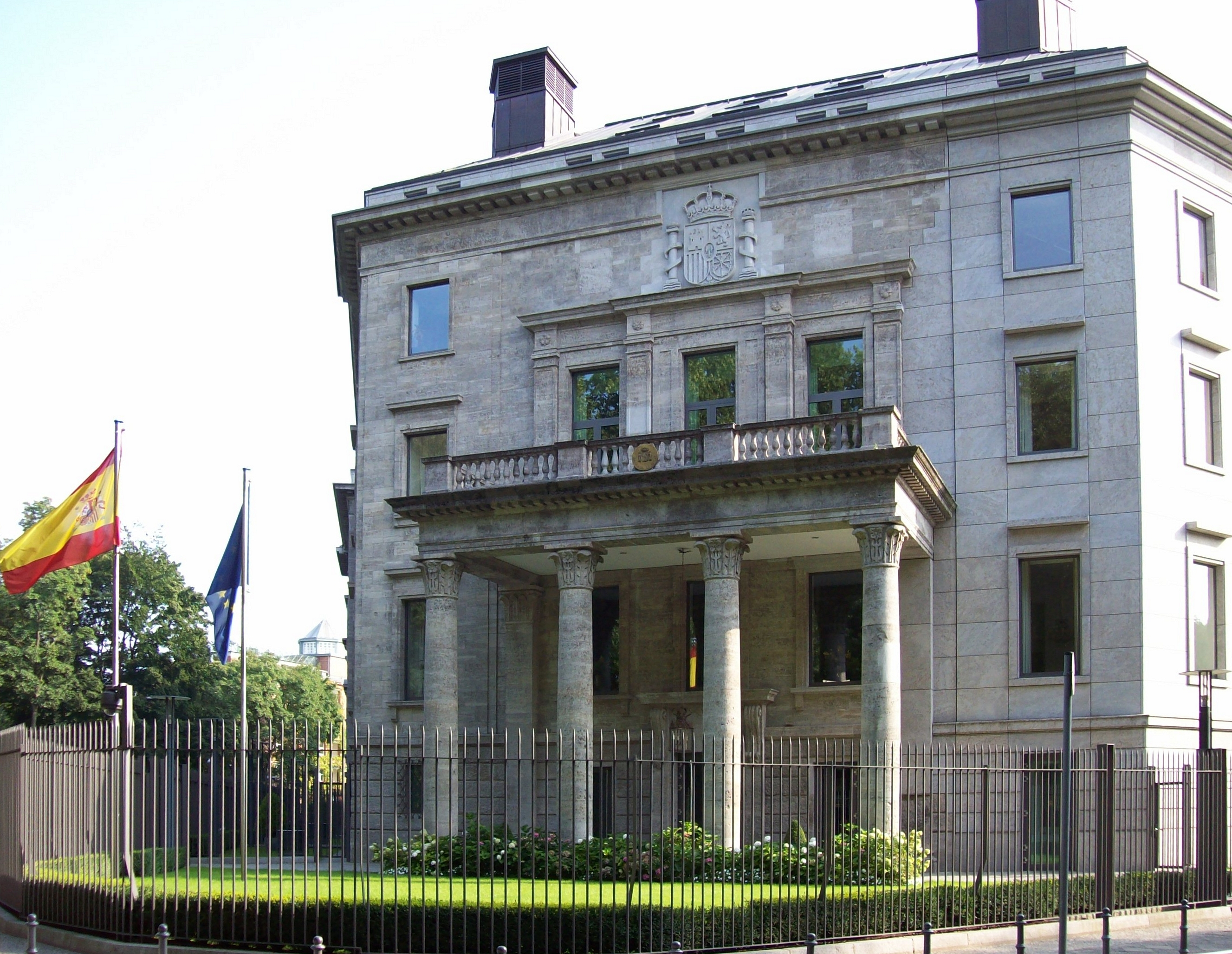
Spanish Embassy

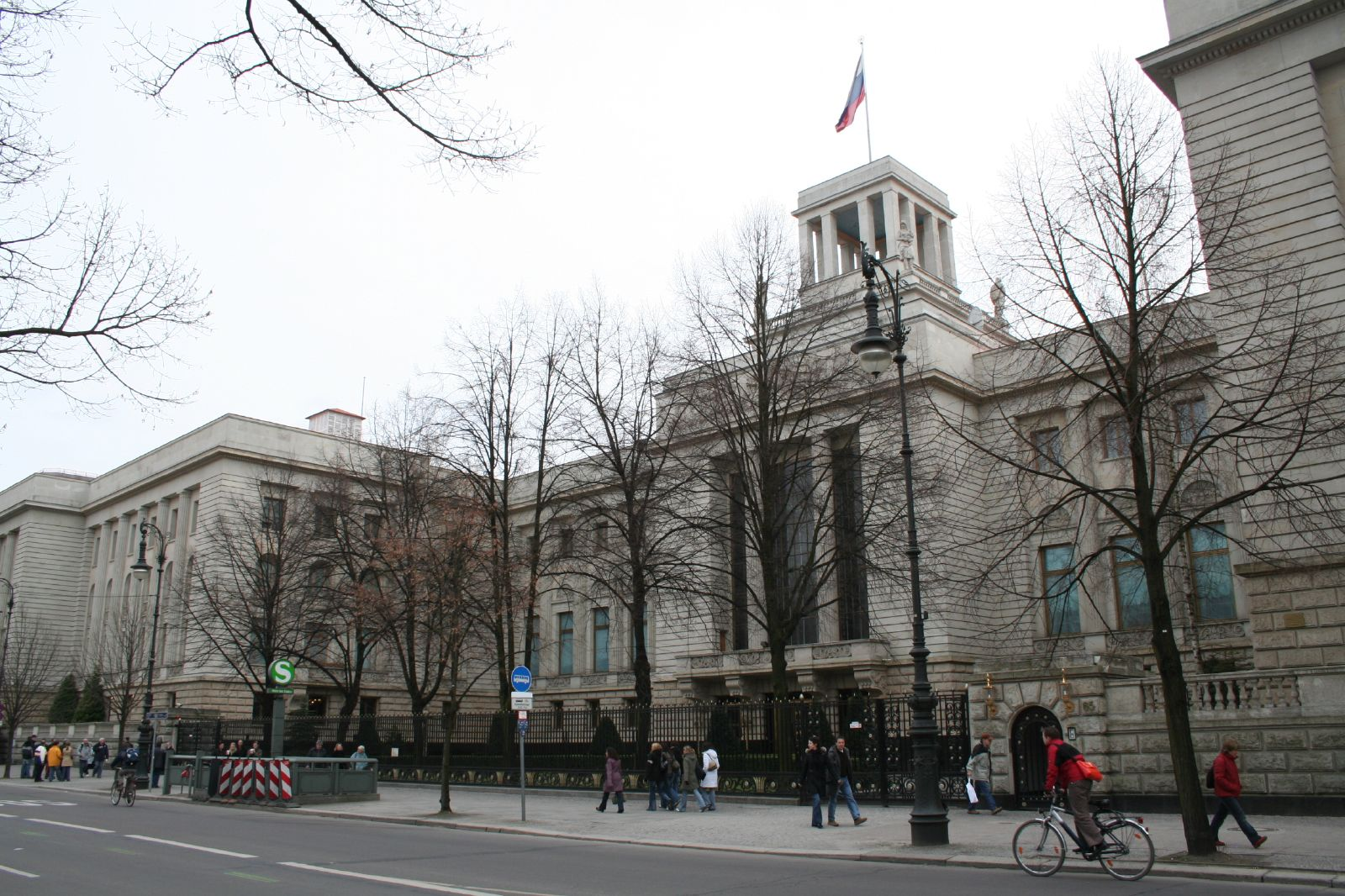
Russian Embassy

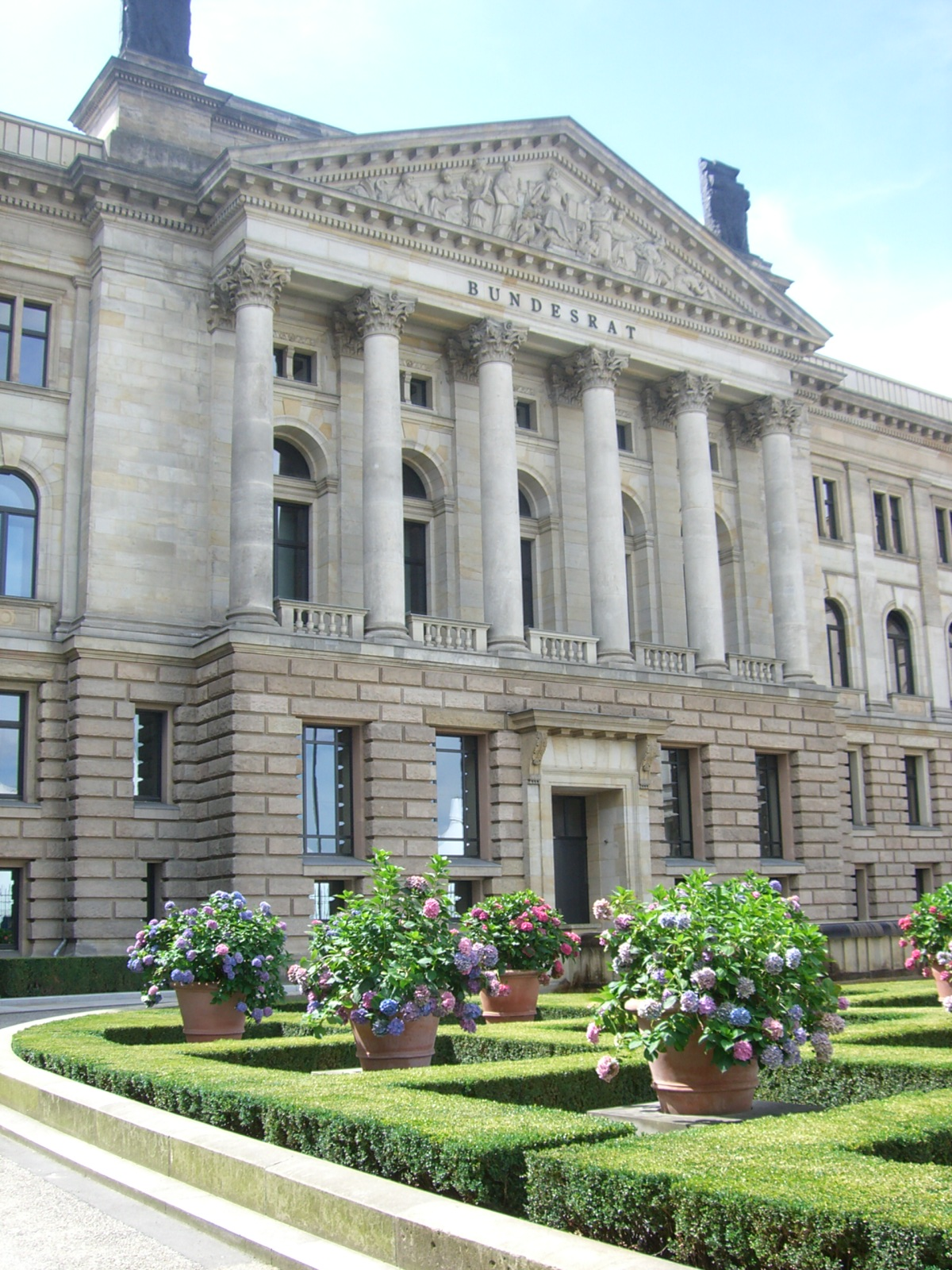
Bundesrat of Germany

== Religious buildings ==
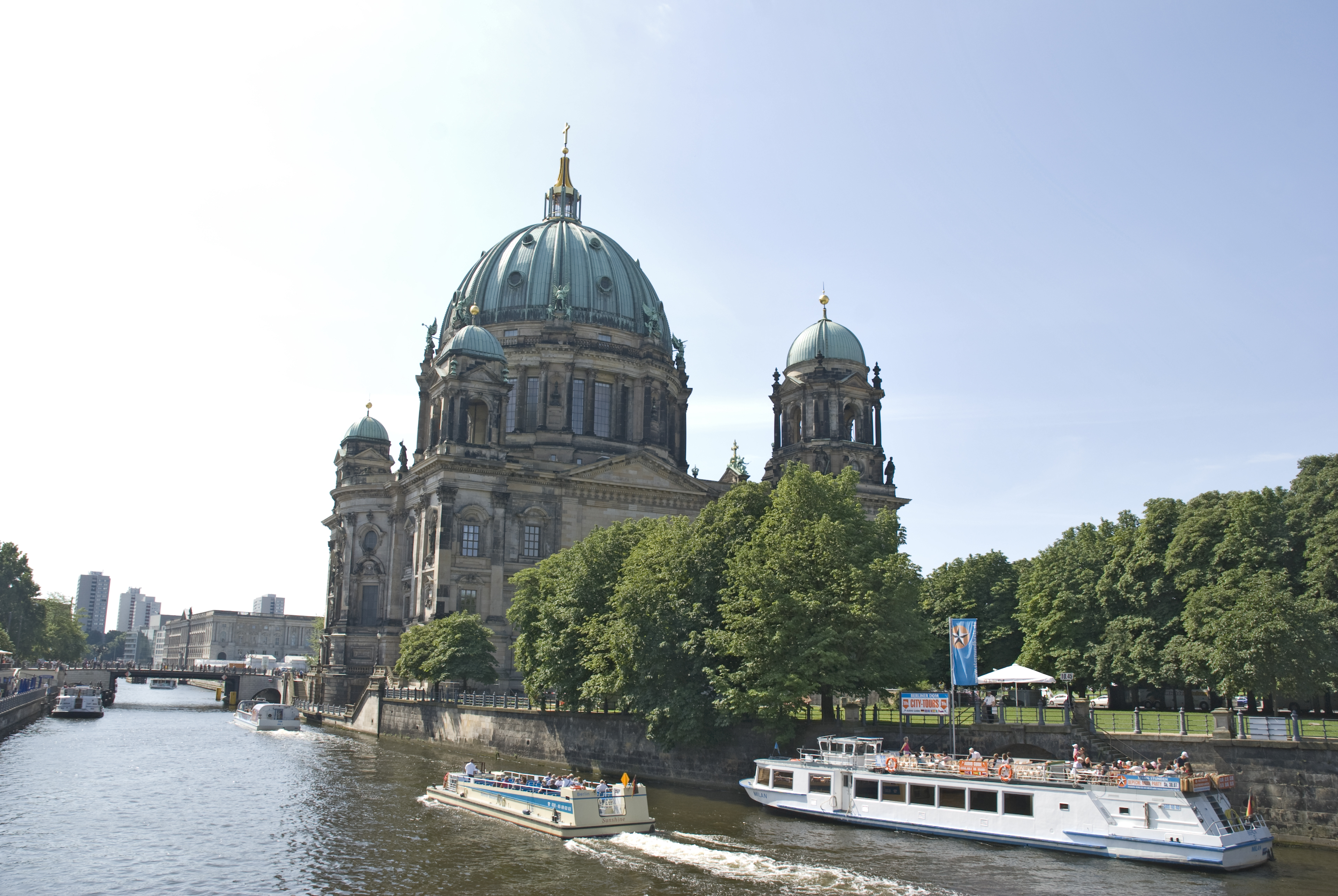
Berlin Cathedral (Dom)

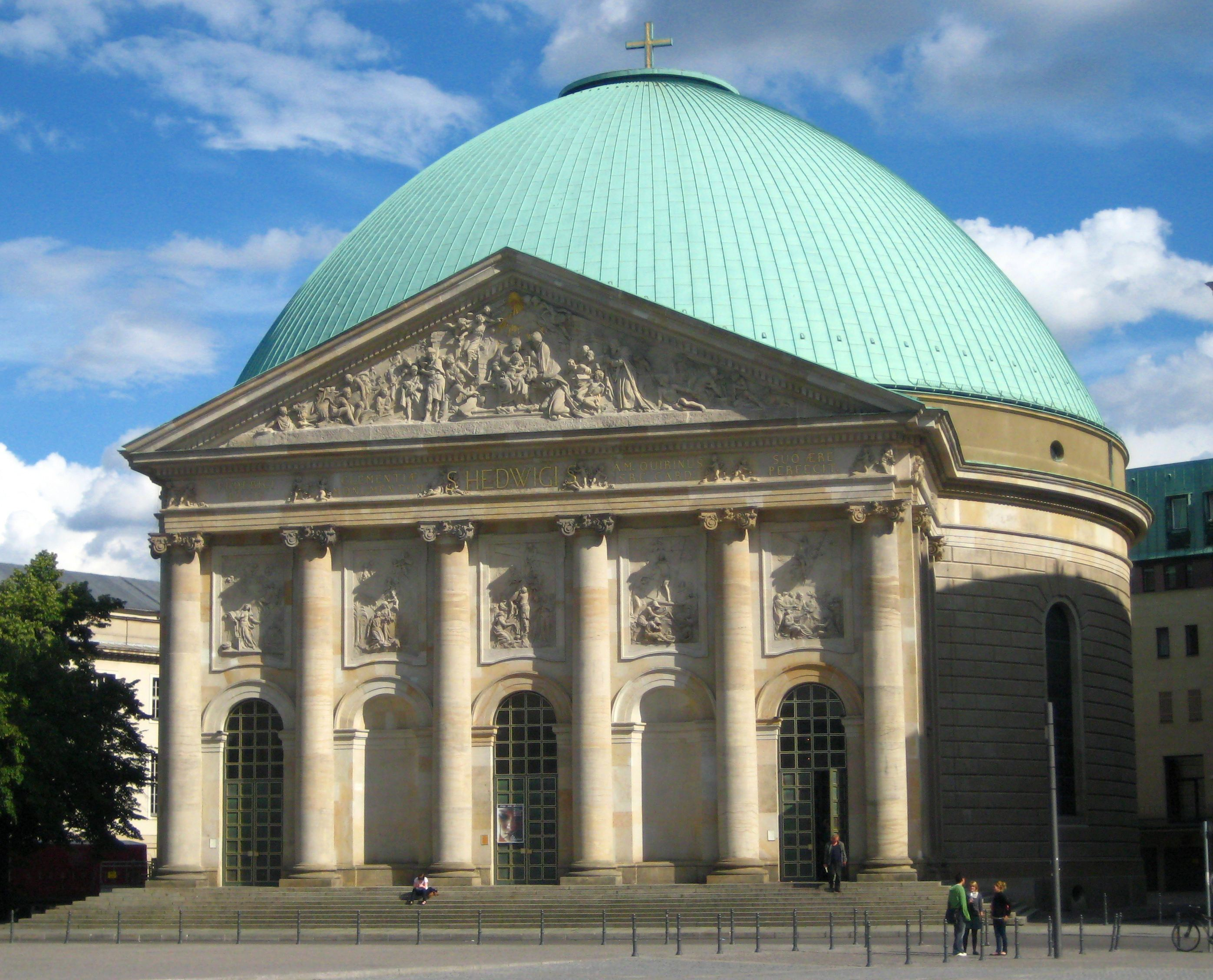
St. Hedwig's Cathedral

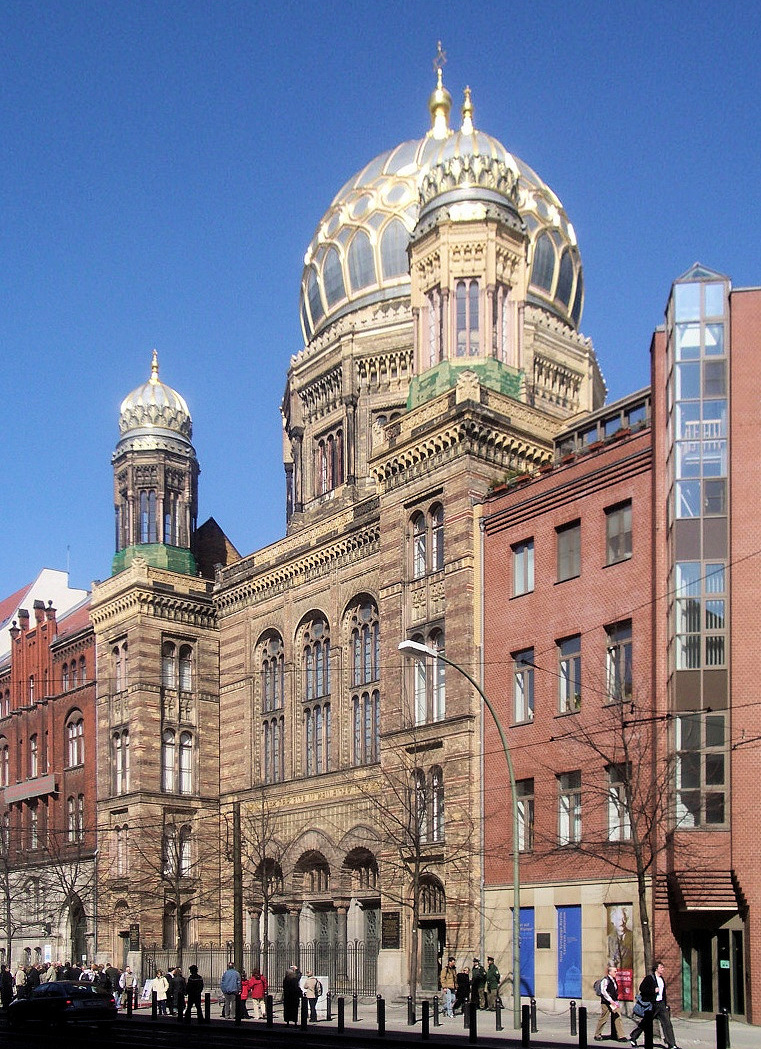
New Synagogue

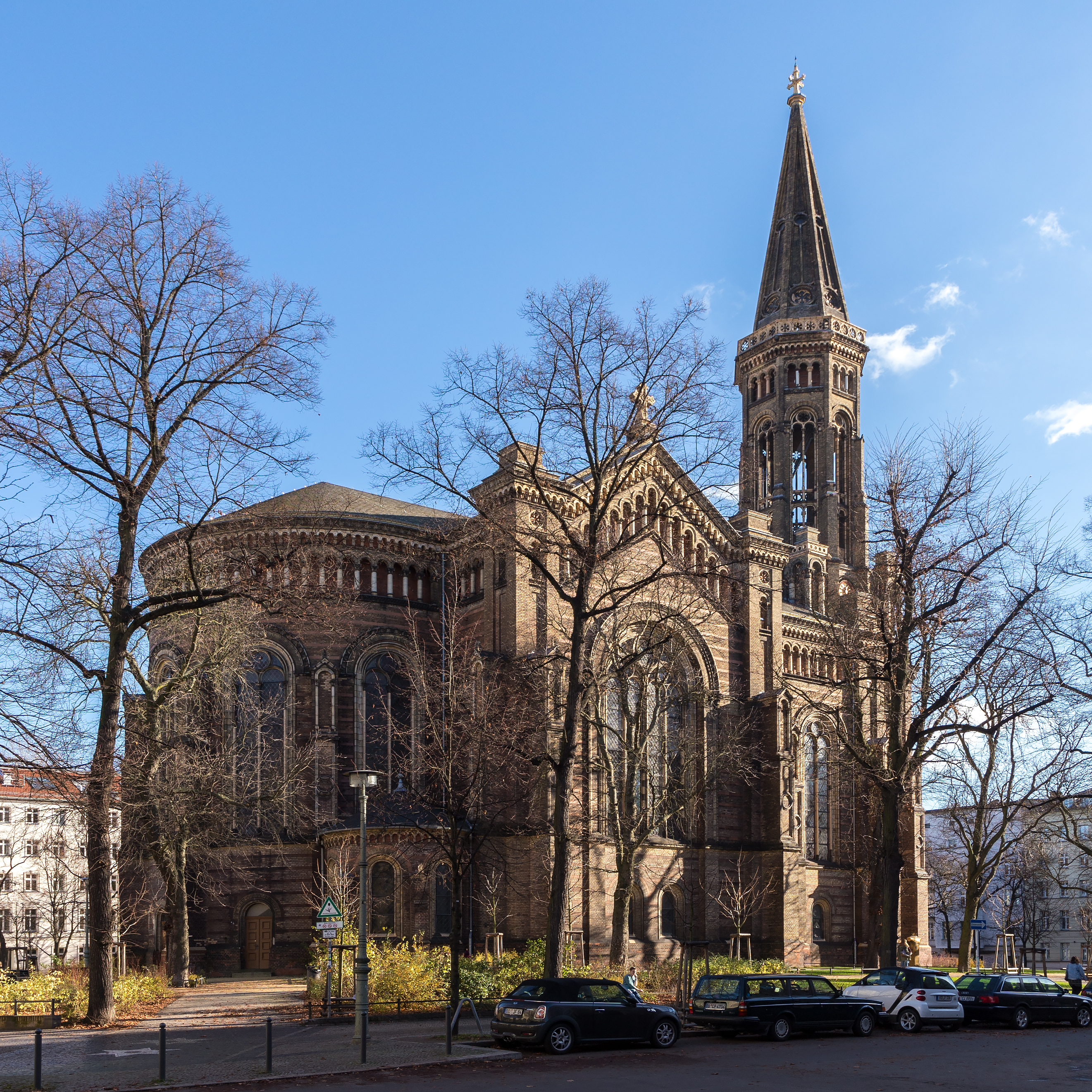
Zionskirche

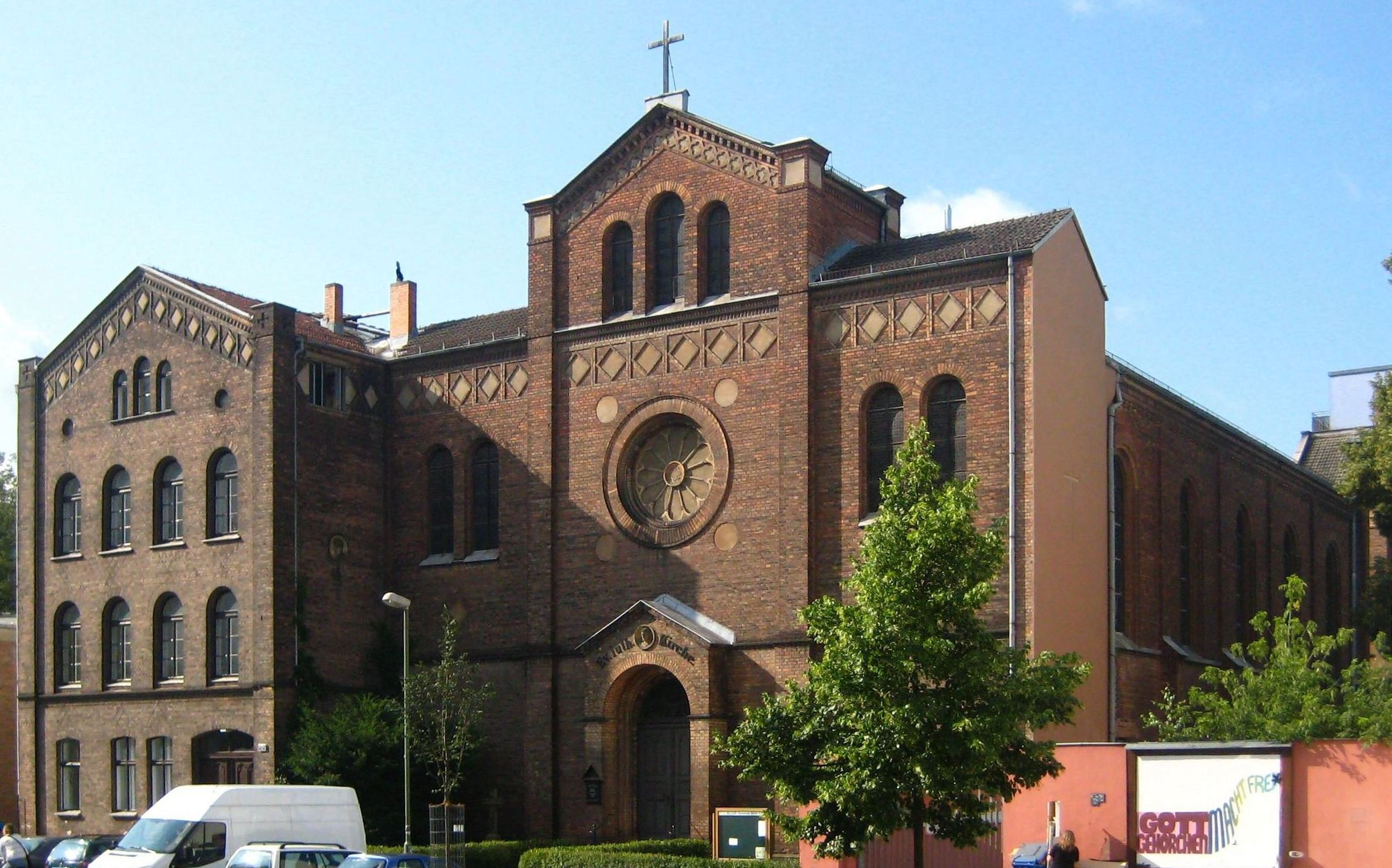
Evangelisch-Lutherische Kirche

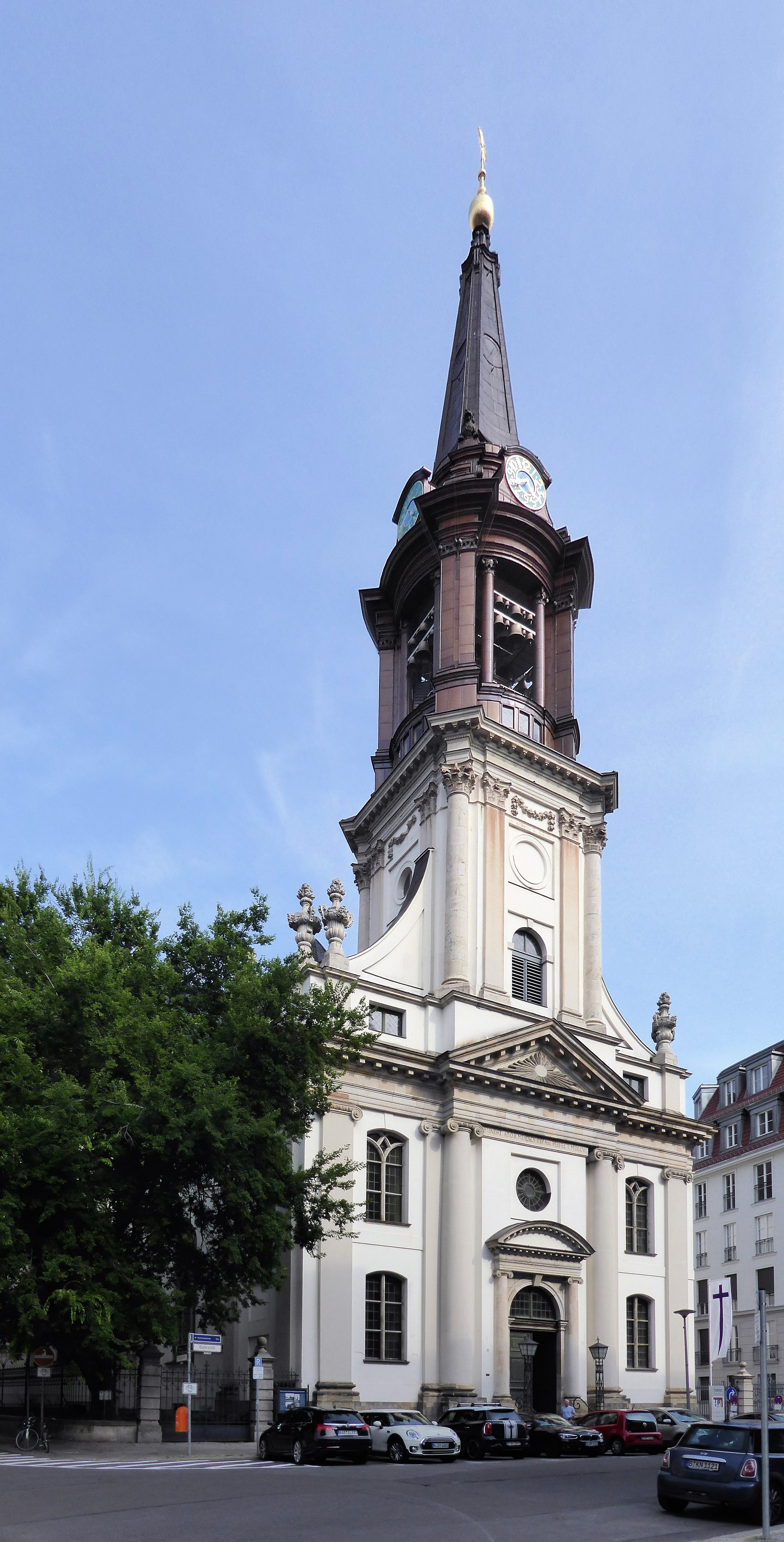
Parochialkirche, Mitte

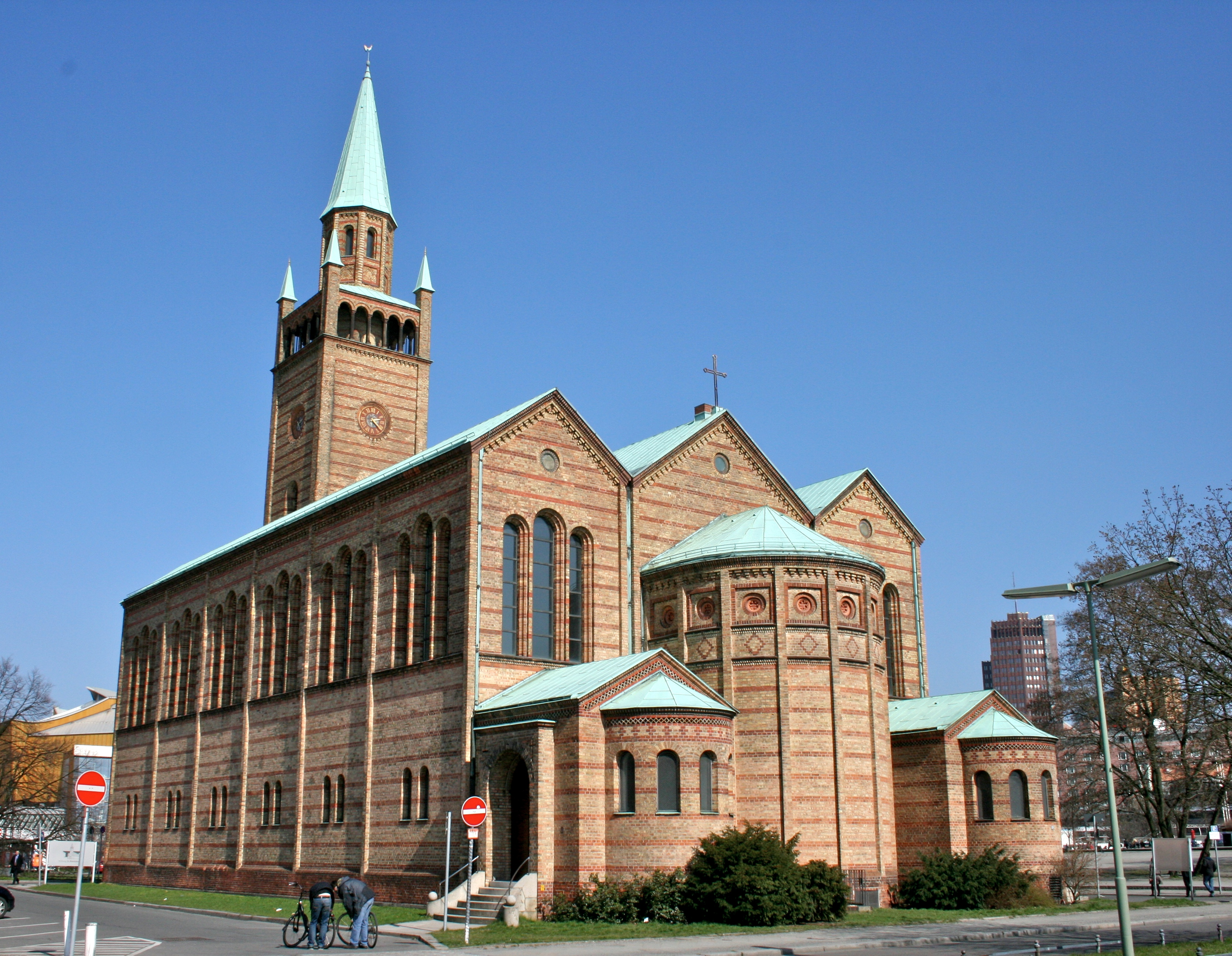
Saint Matthew's Church

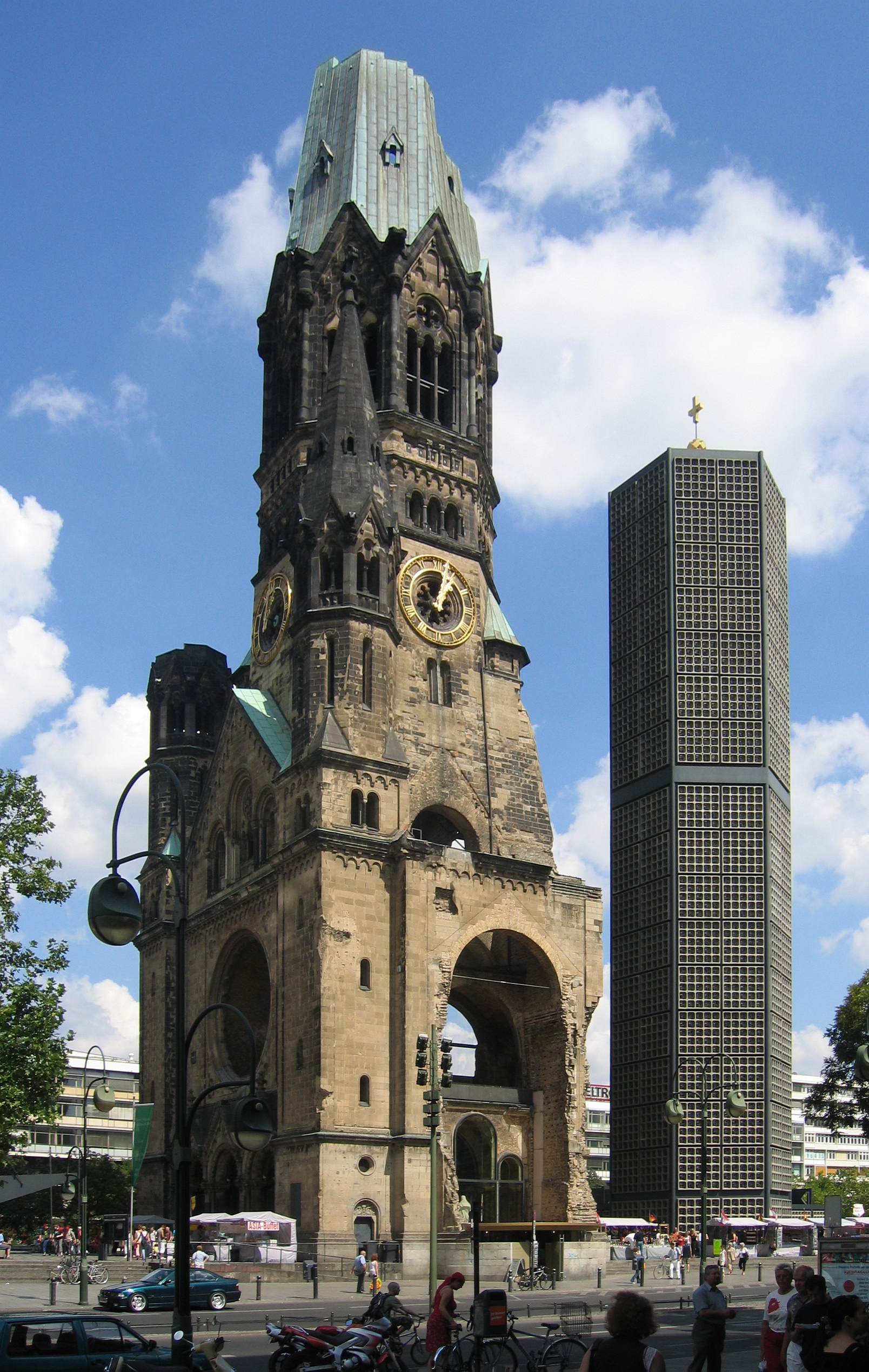
Kaiser Wilhelm Memorial Church

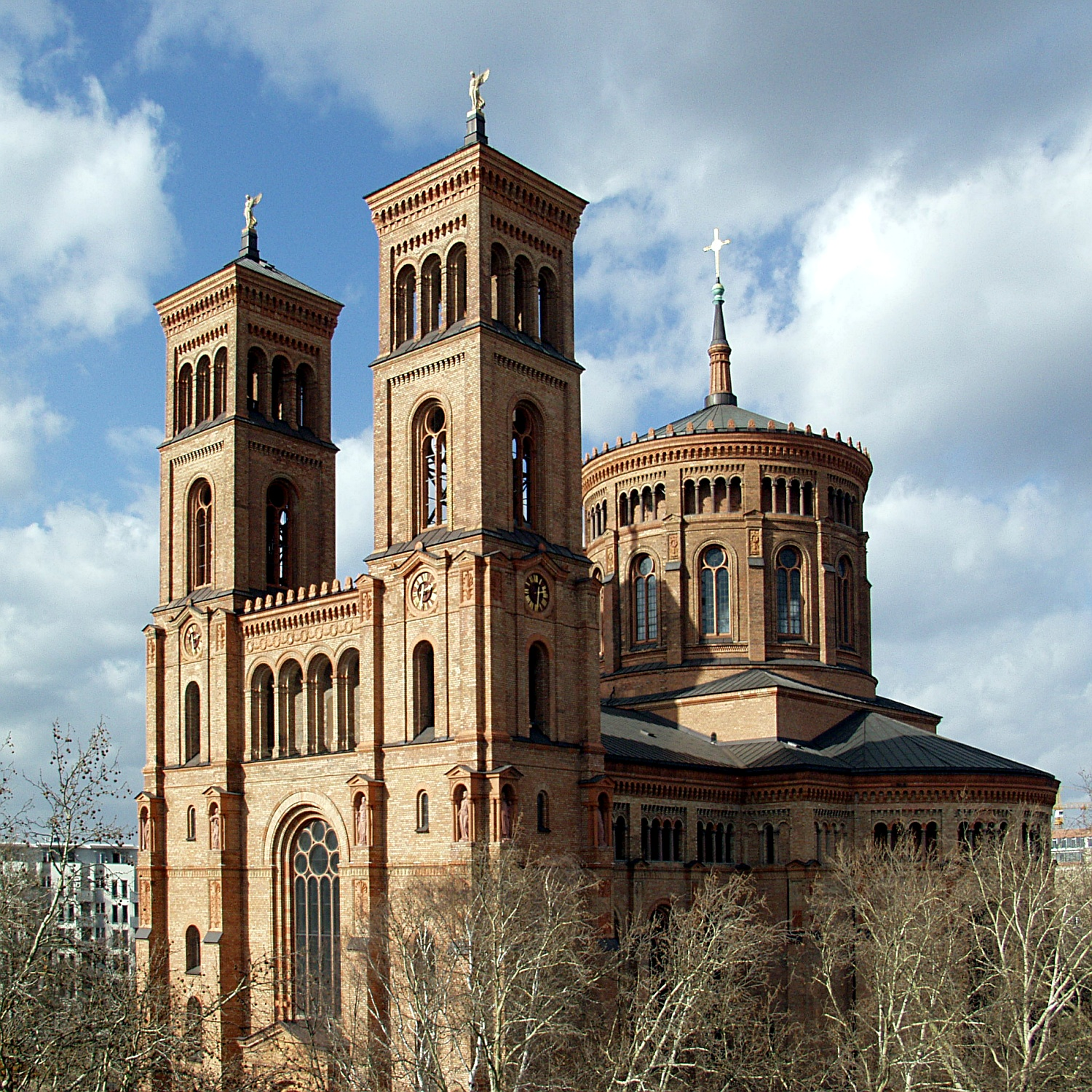
St.-Thomas-Kirche, Kreuzberg

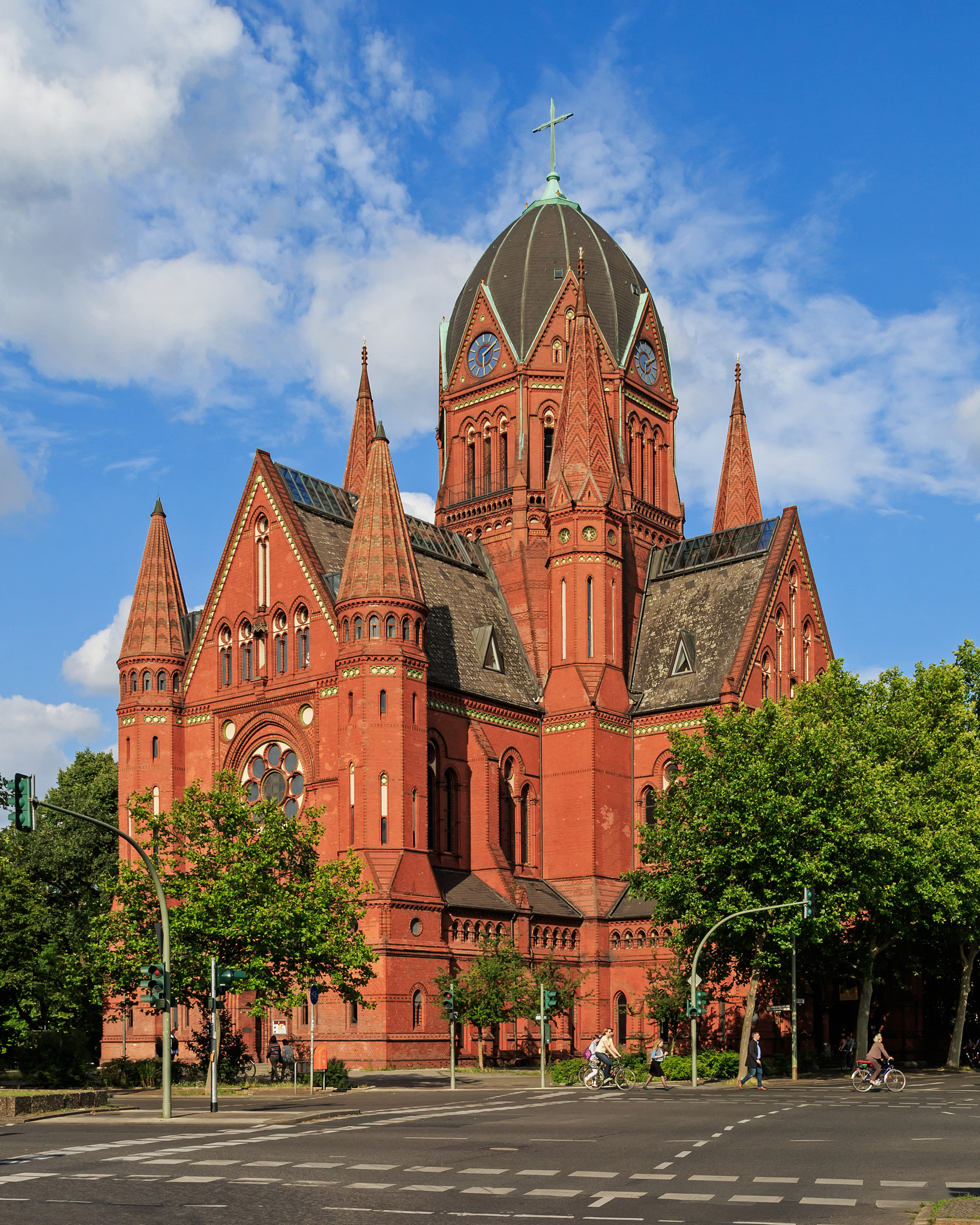
Heilig-Kreuz-Kirche, Kreuzberg

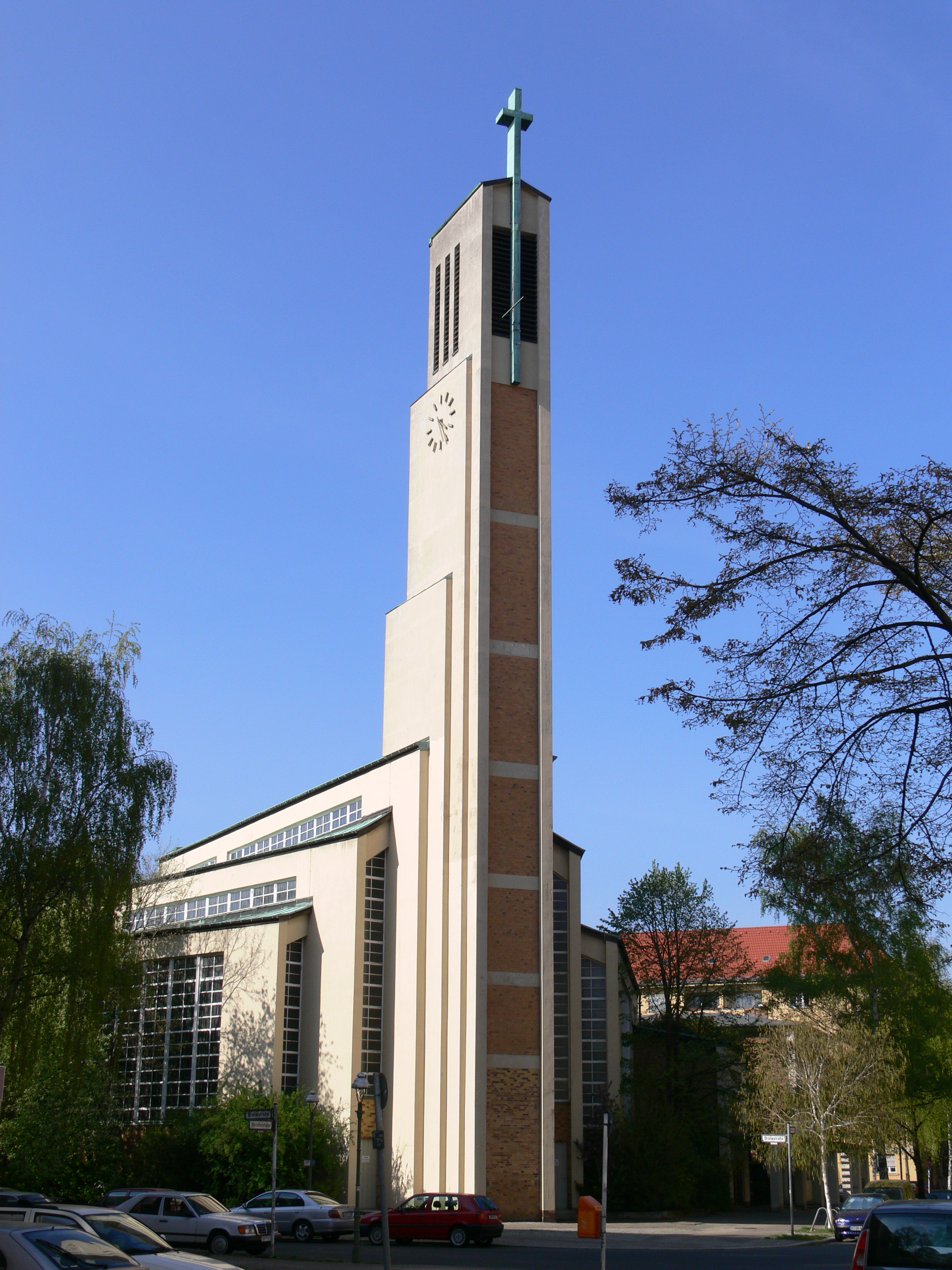
Gustav Adolf Kirche, Charlottenburg

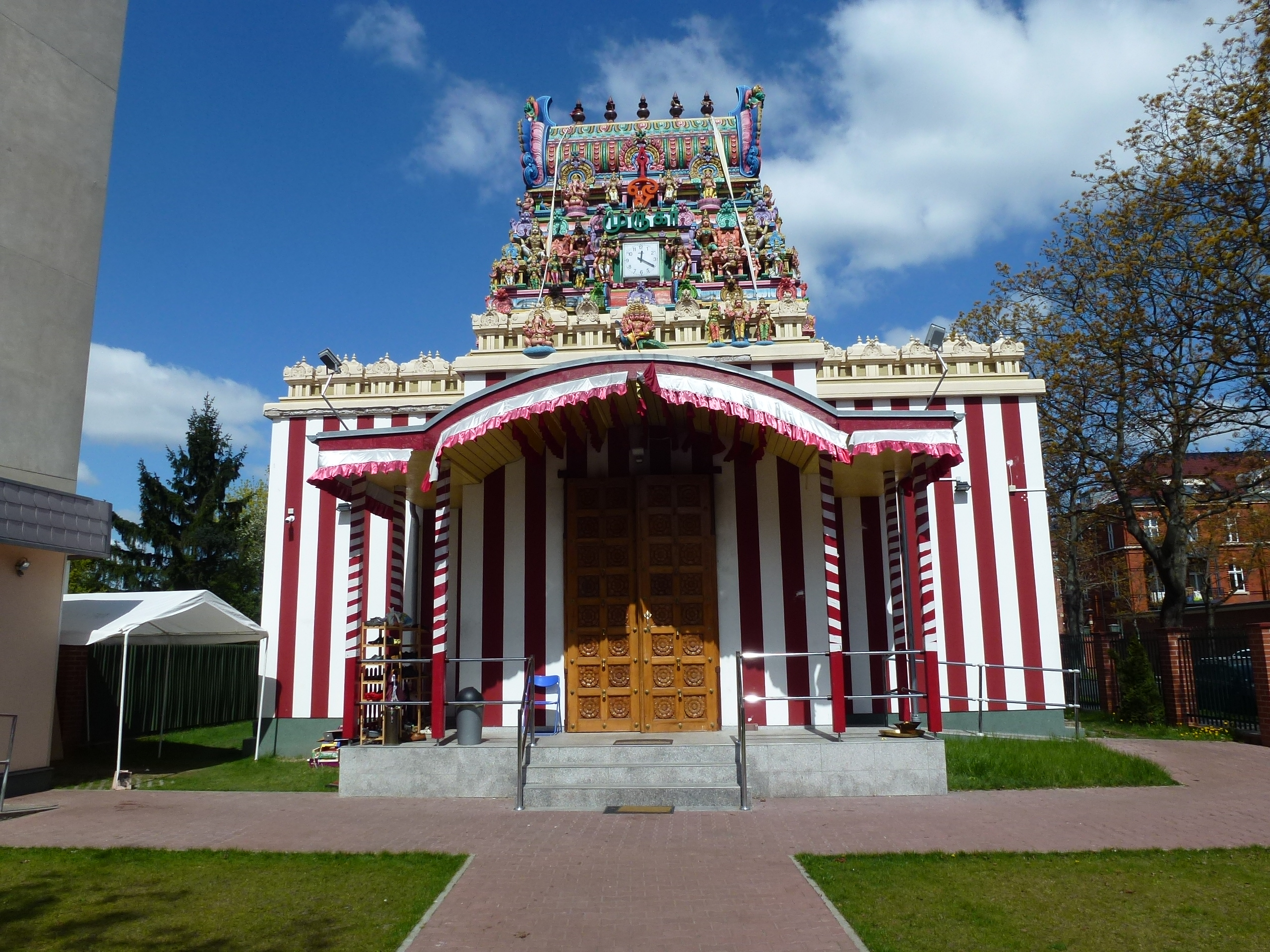
Sri-Mayurapathy-Murugan Temple

== Neighbourhoods ==
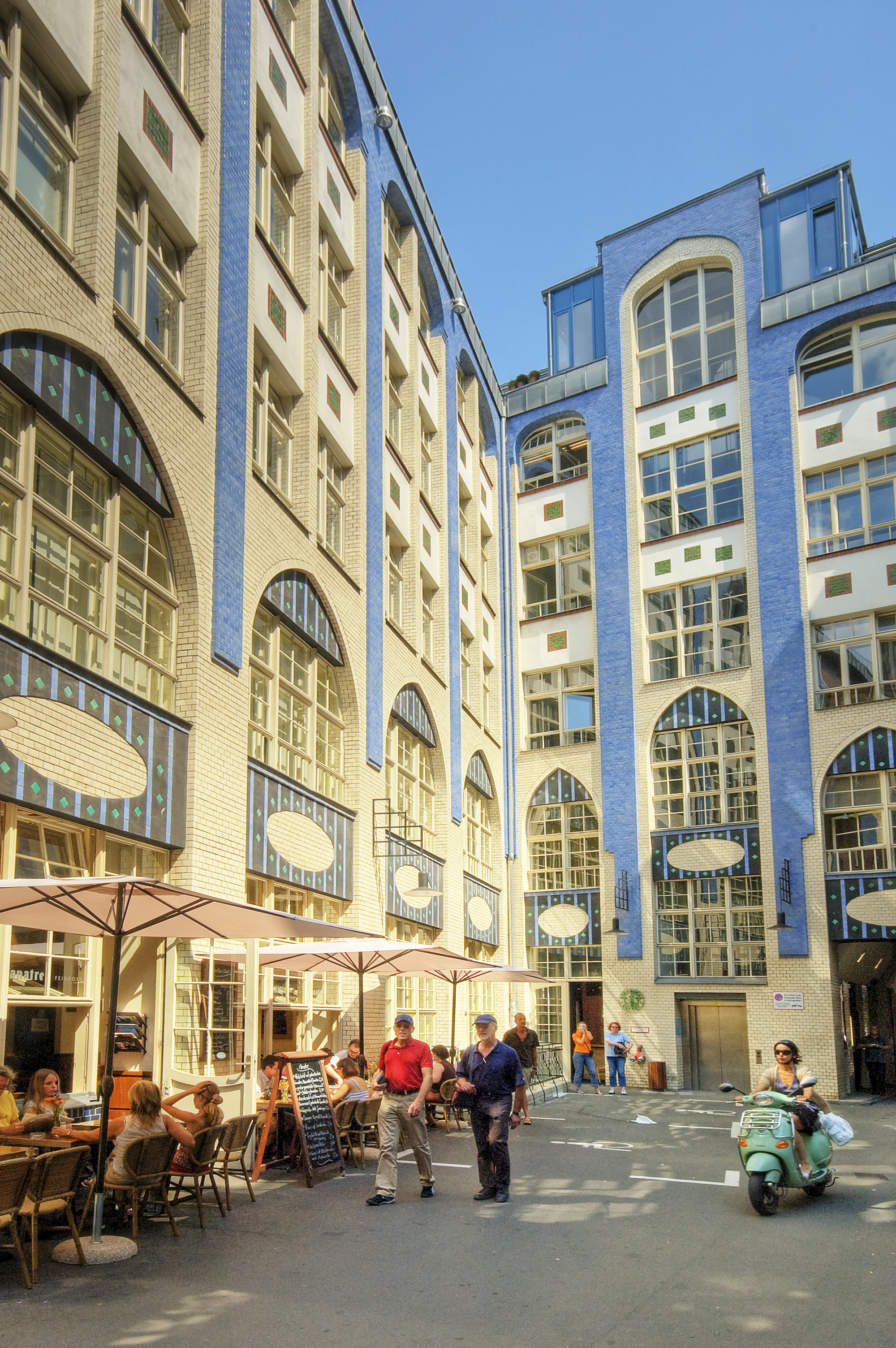
Hackesche Höfe

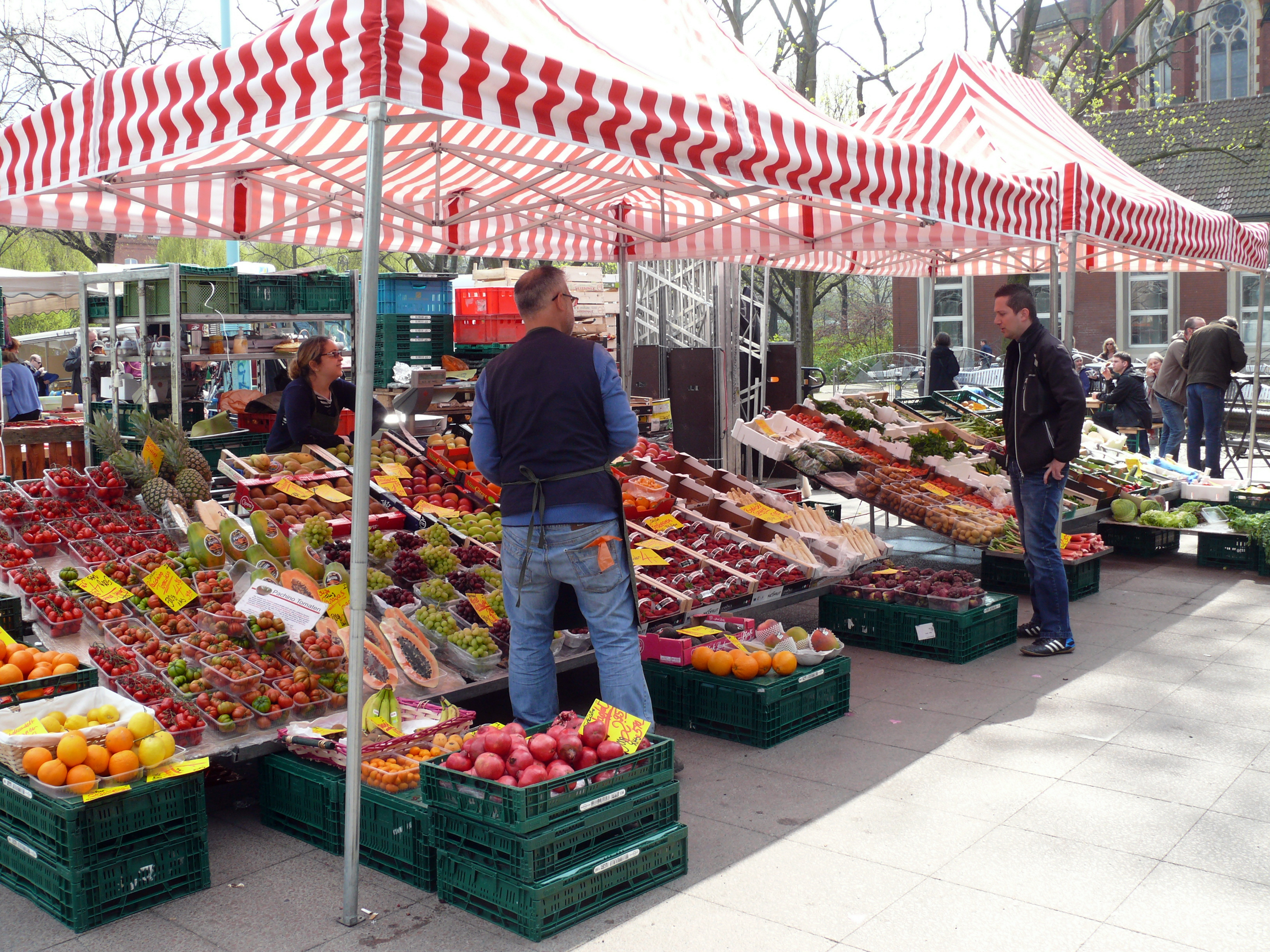
Winterfeldtplatz, Schöneberg

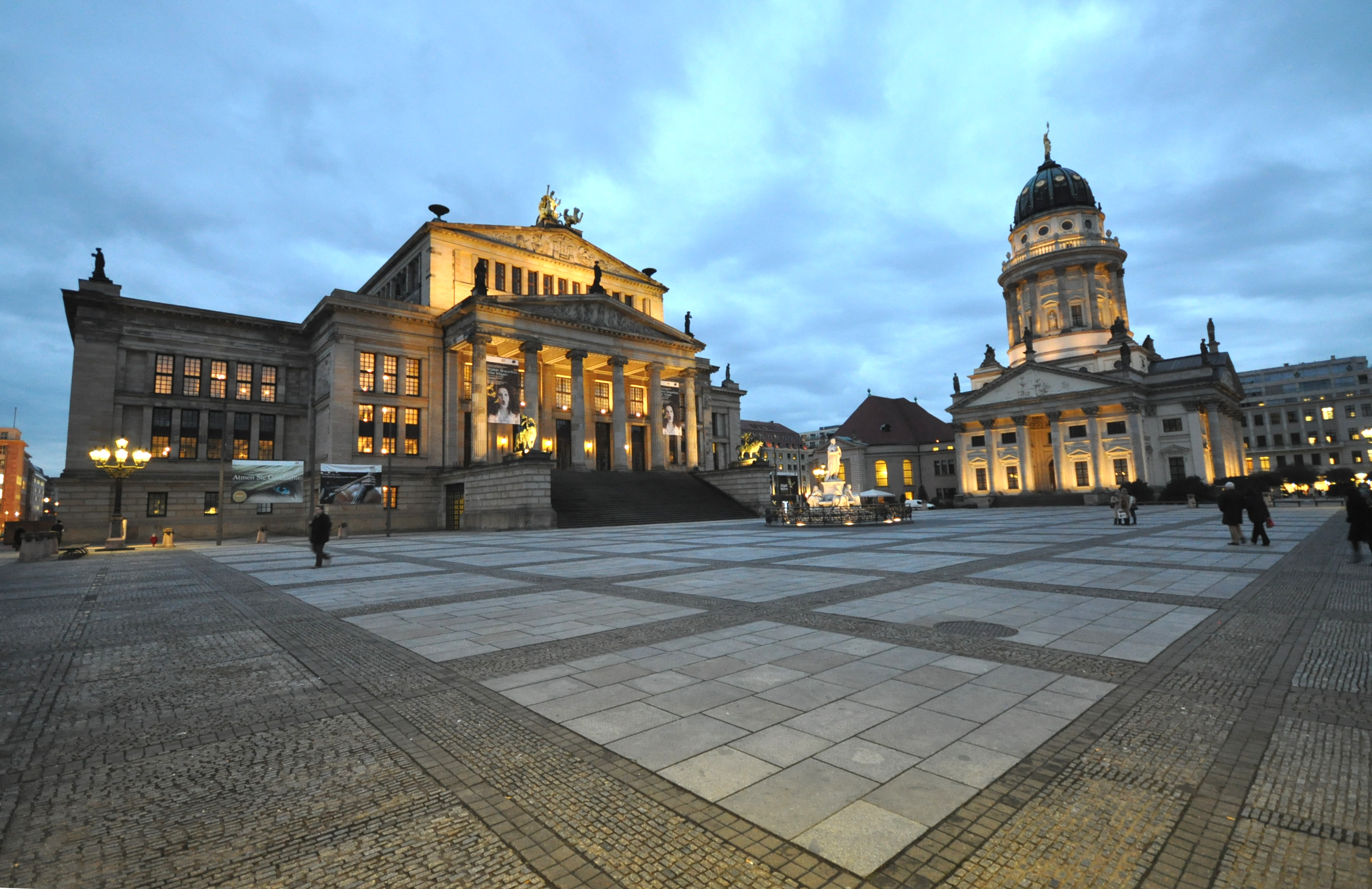
Gendarmenmarkt with French Cathedral

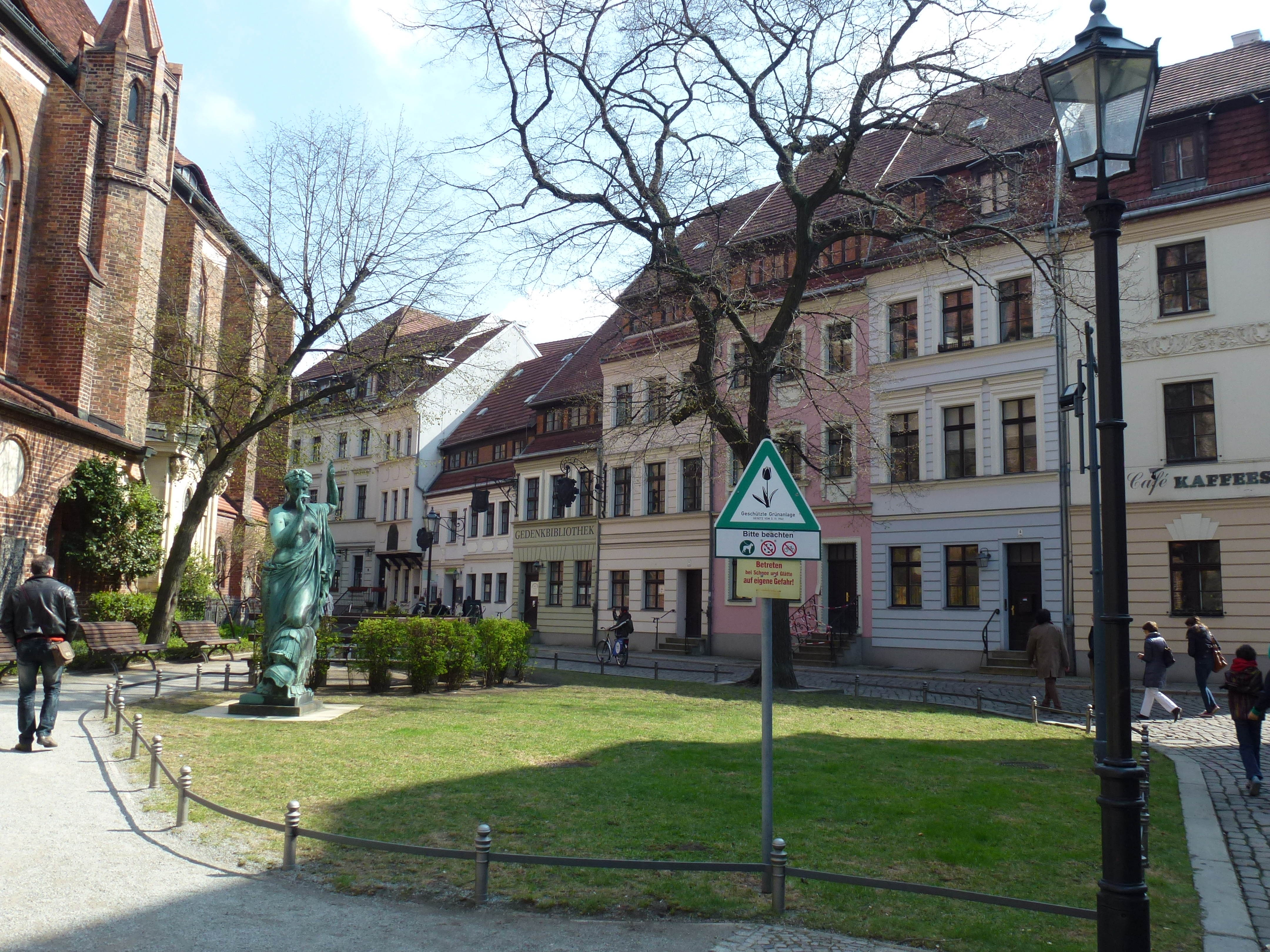
Nikolaiviertel (Nikolai quarter)

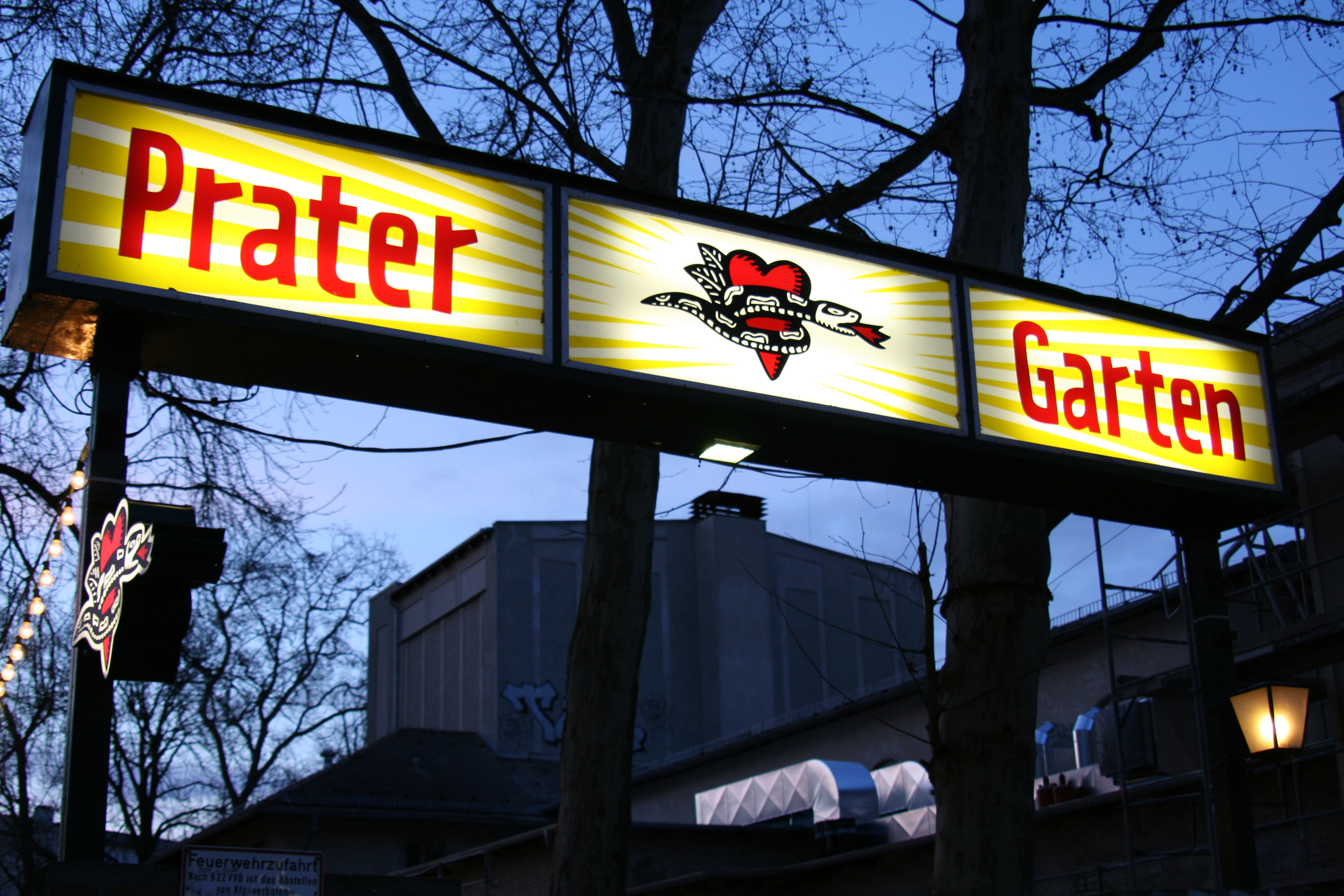
Prater in Prenzlauer Berg

Pariser Platz with Brandenburg Gate

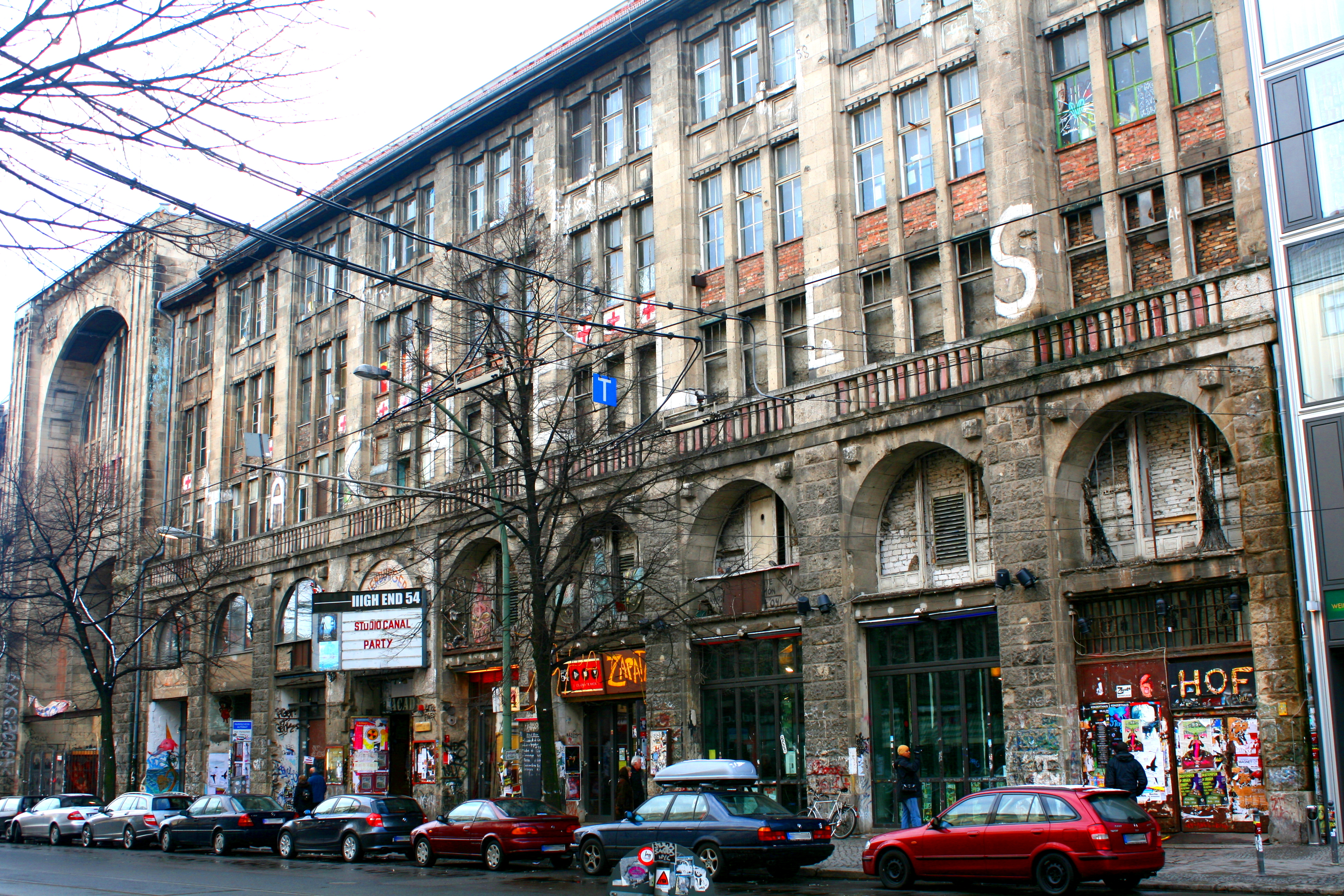
Kunsthaus Tacheles at Oranienburger Straße

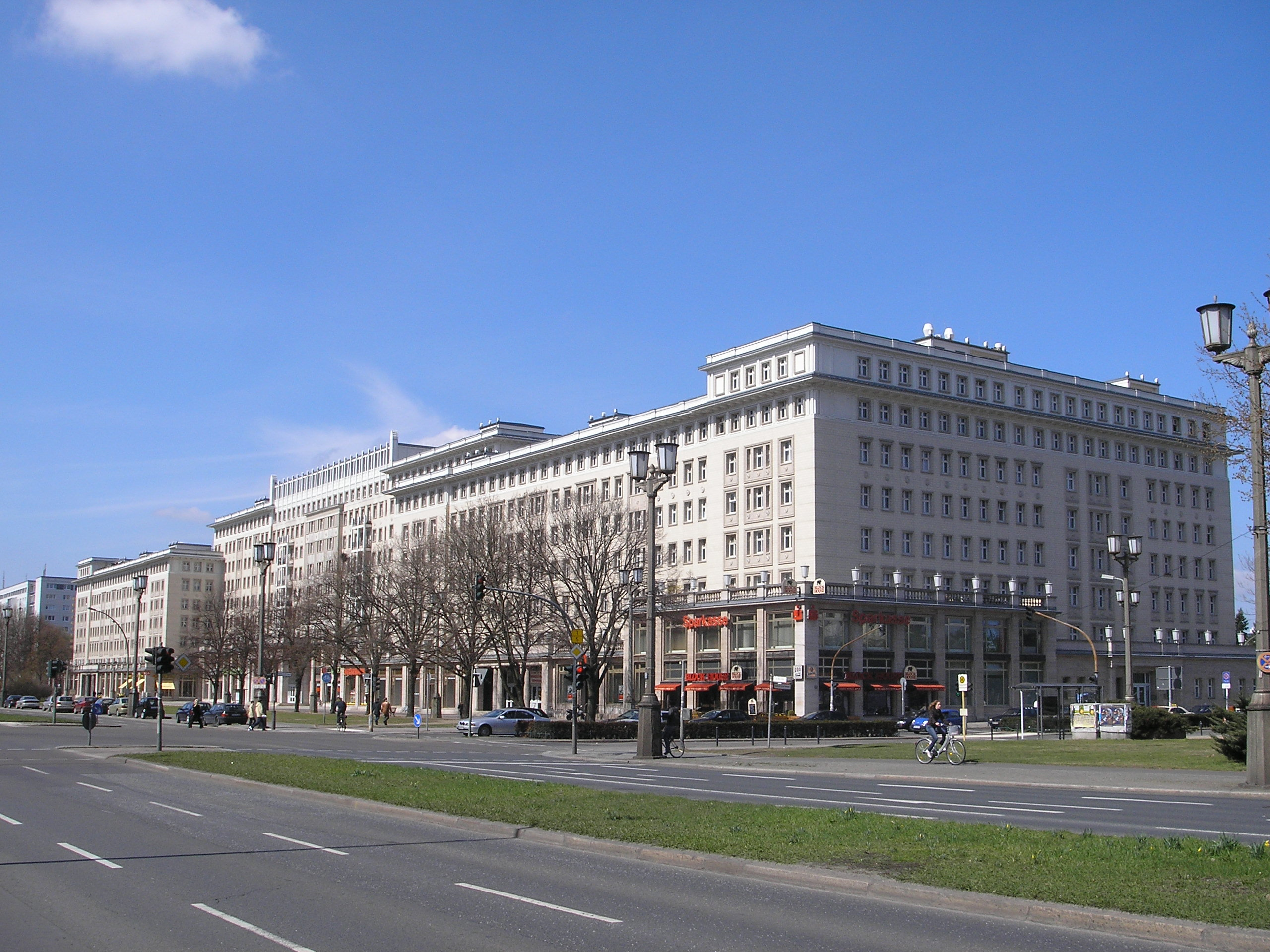
Karl-Marx-Allee, monumental boulevard

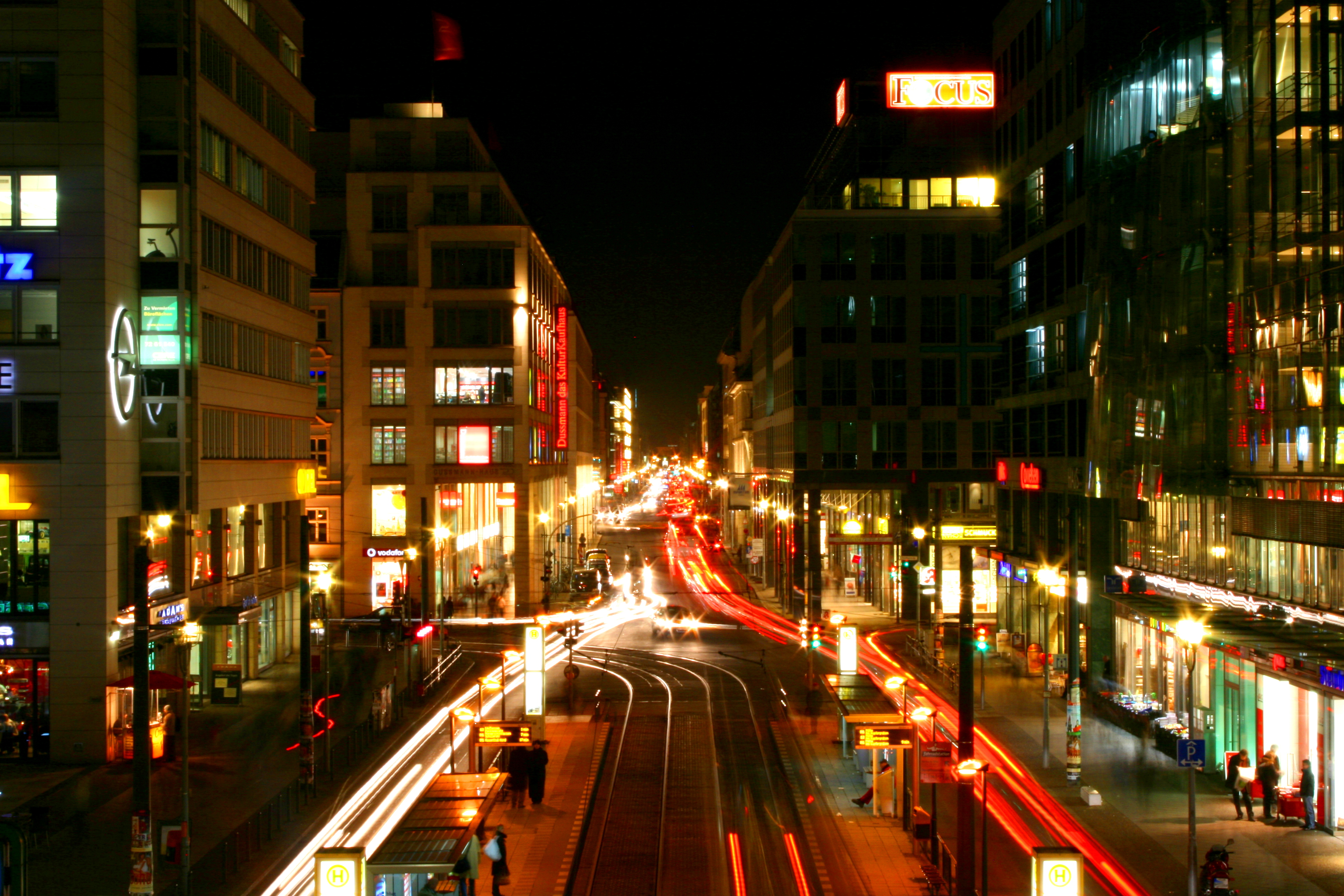
Friedrichstraße, shopping boulevard

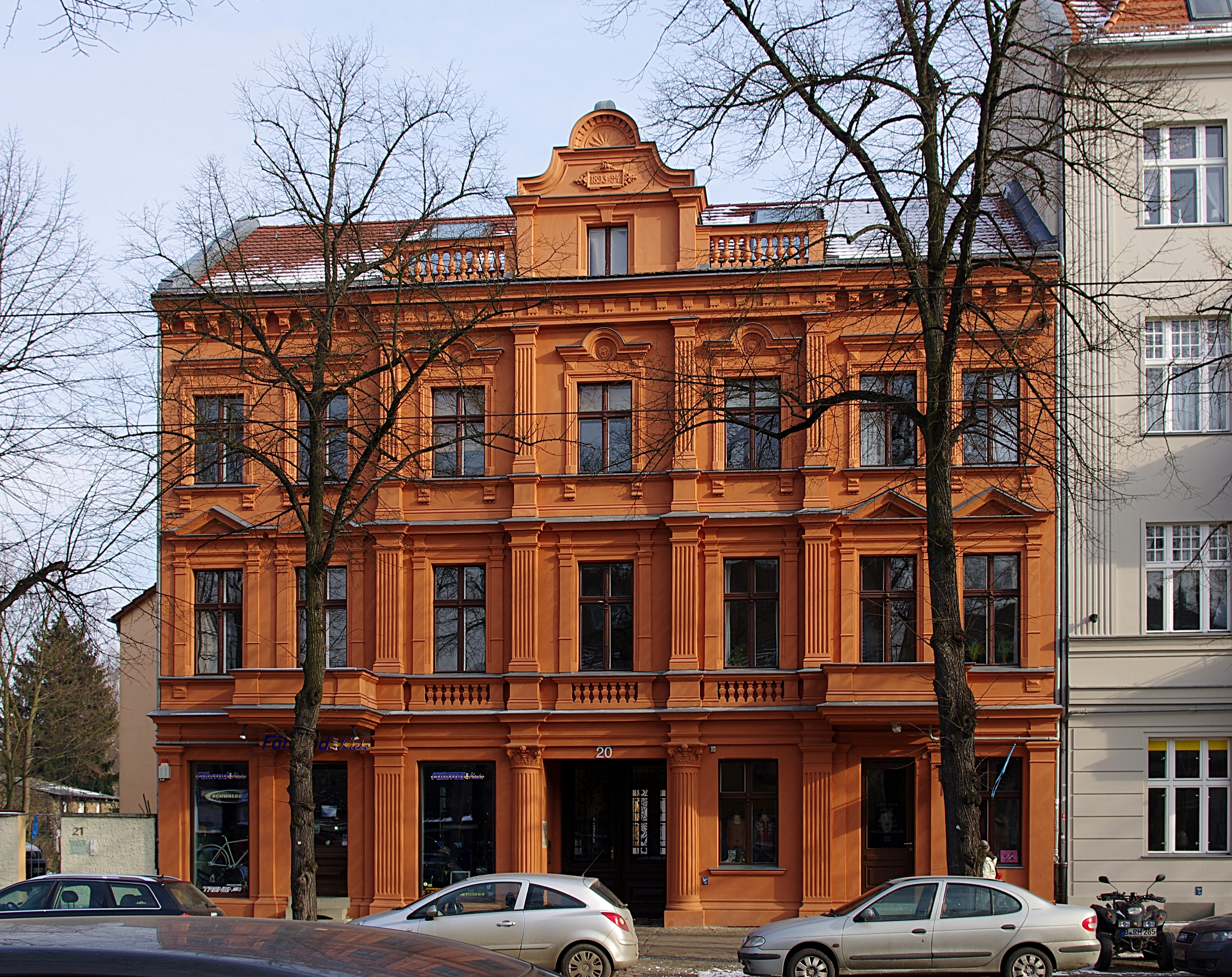
Bölschestraße in Friedrichshagen

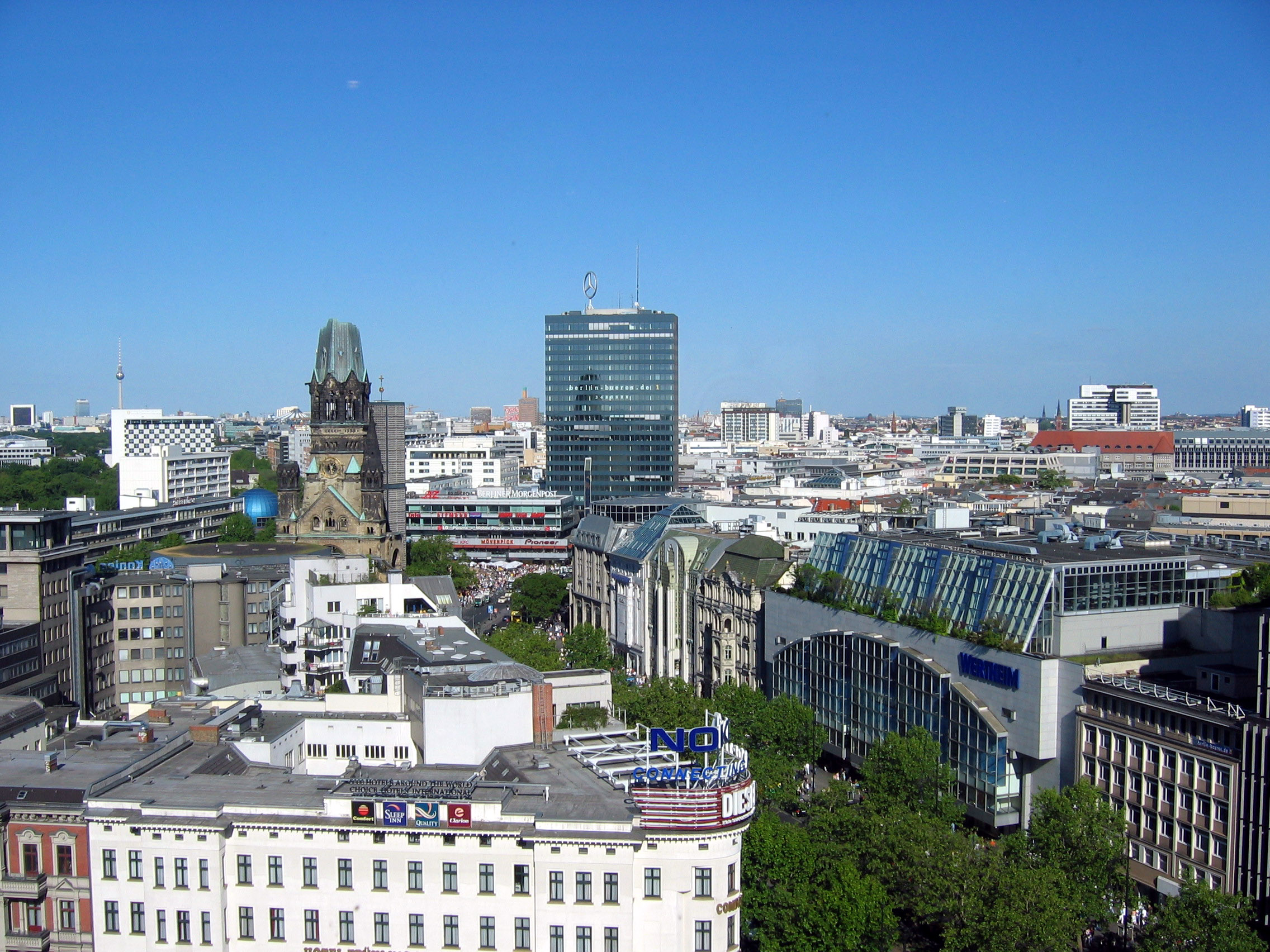
Kurfürstendamm and Europa-Center

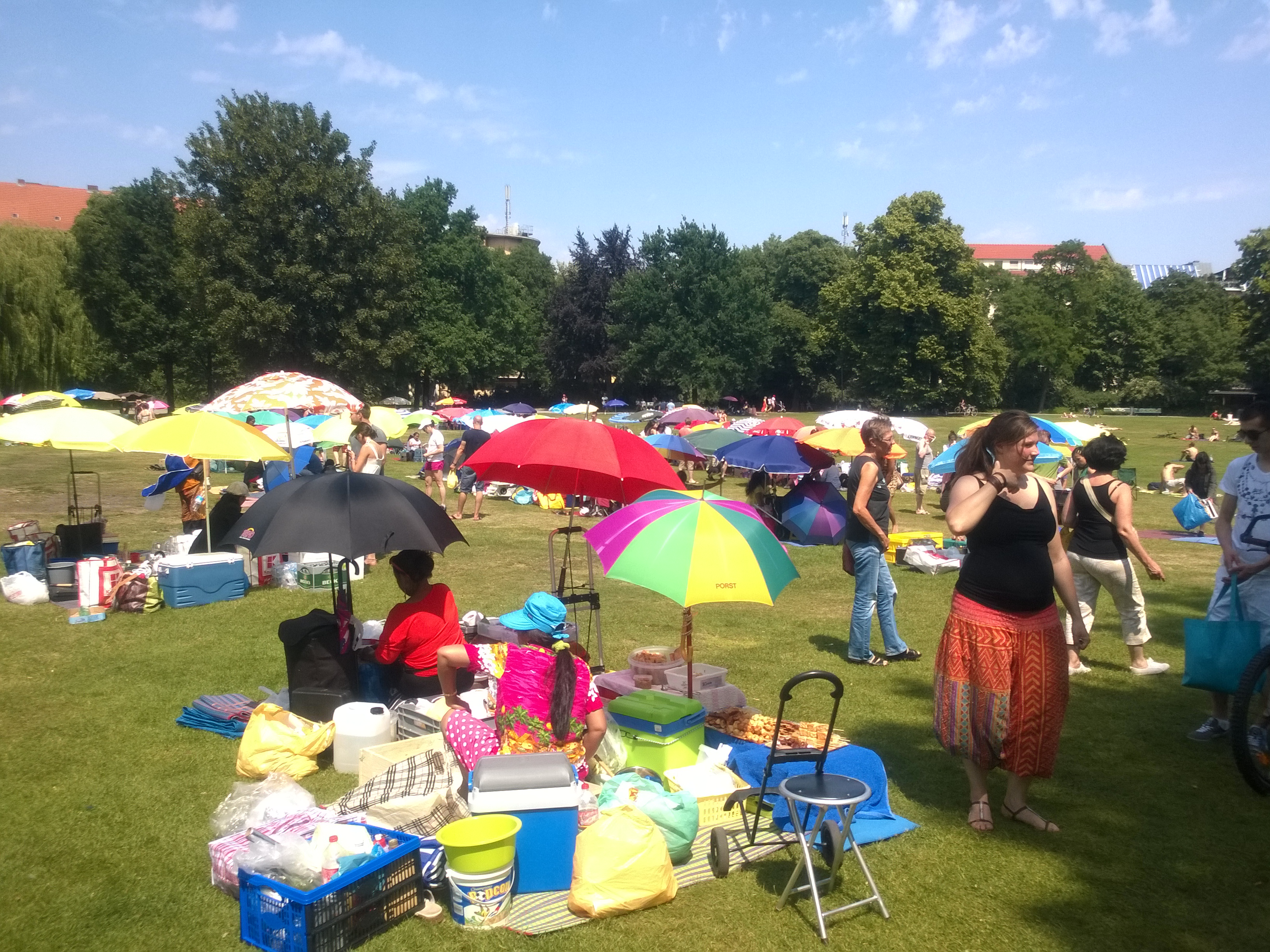
Asian market in Wilmersdorf

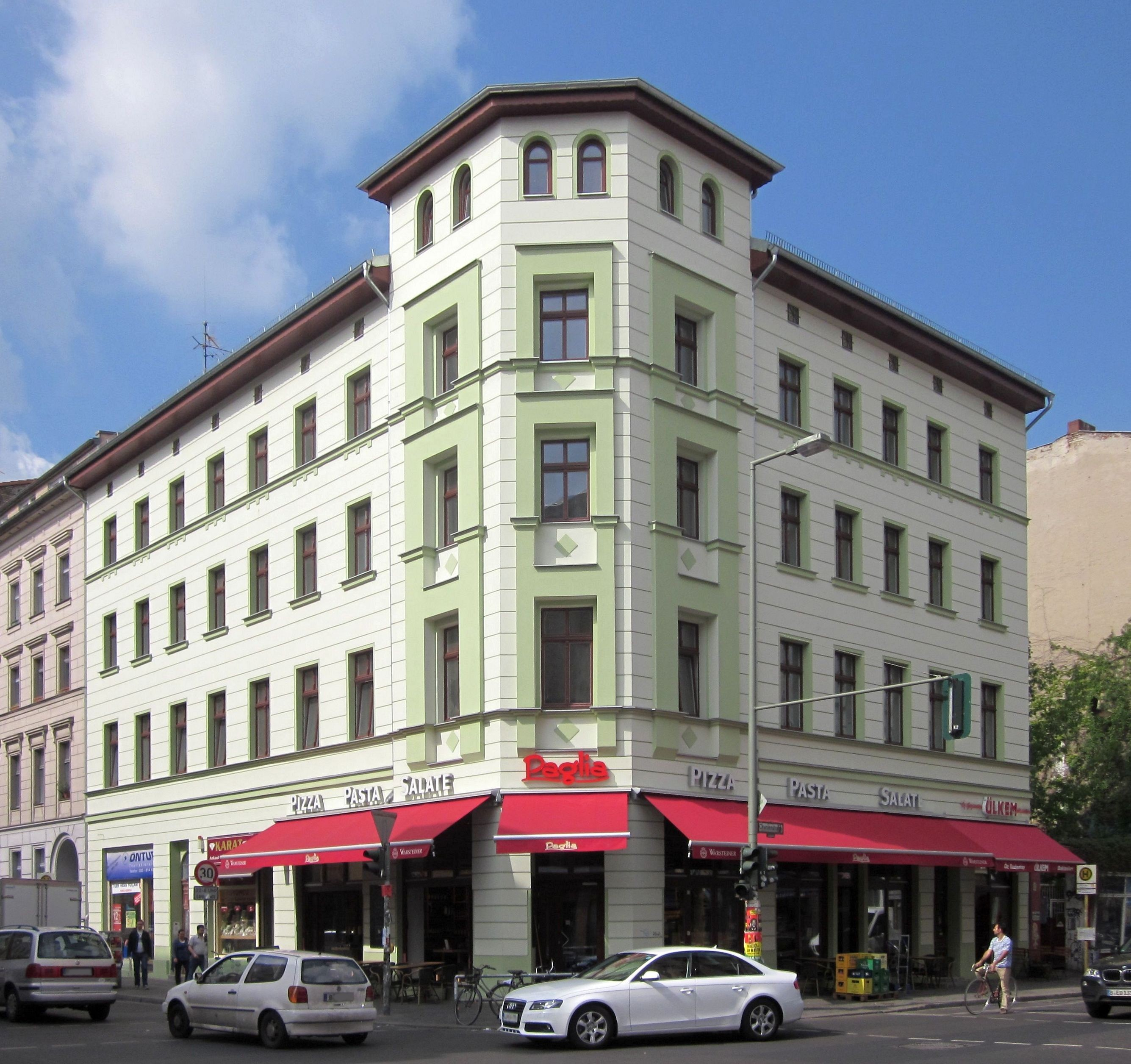
Oranienstraße in Kreuzberg

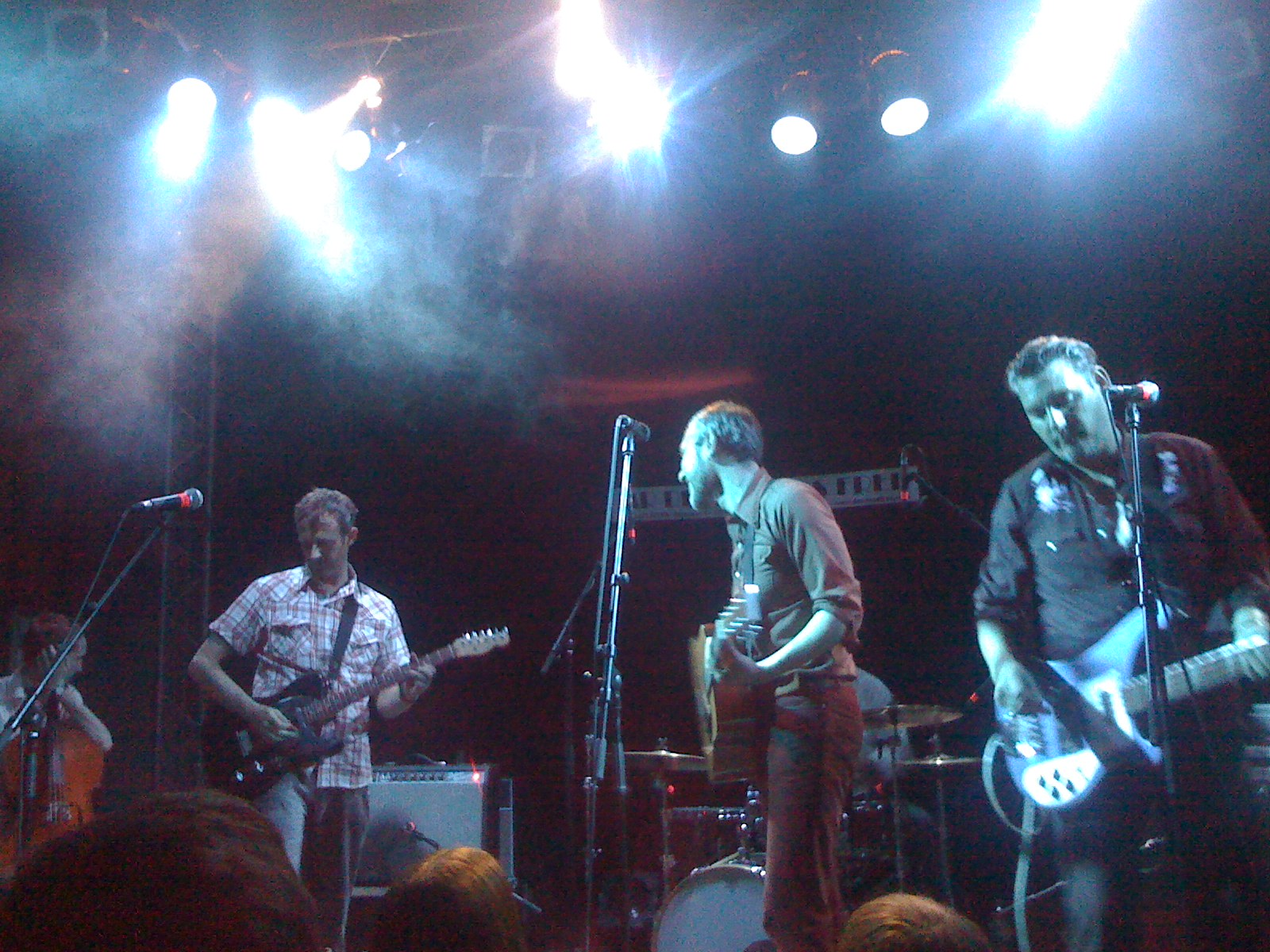
Lido stage, Kreuzberg

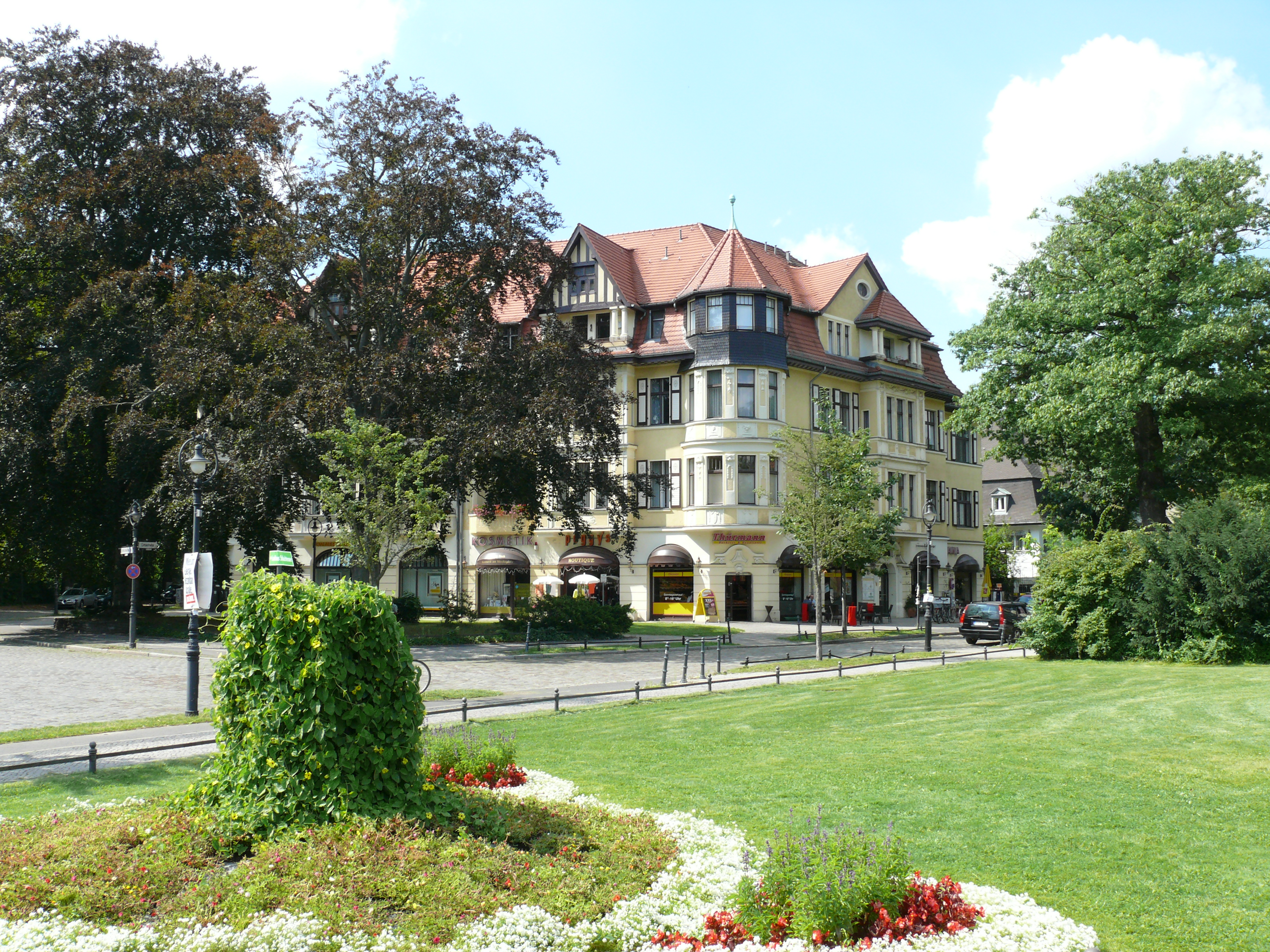
Mexikoplatz, Zehlendorf

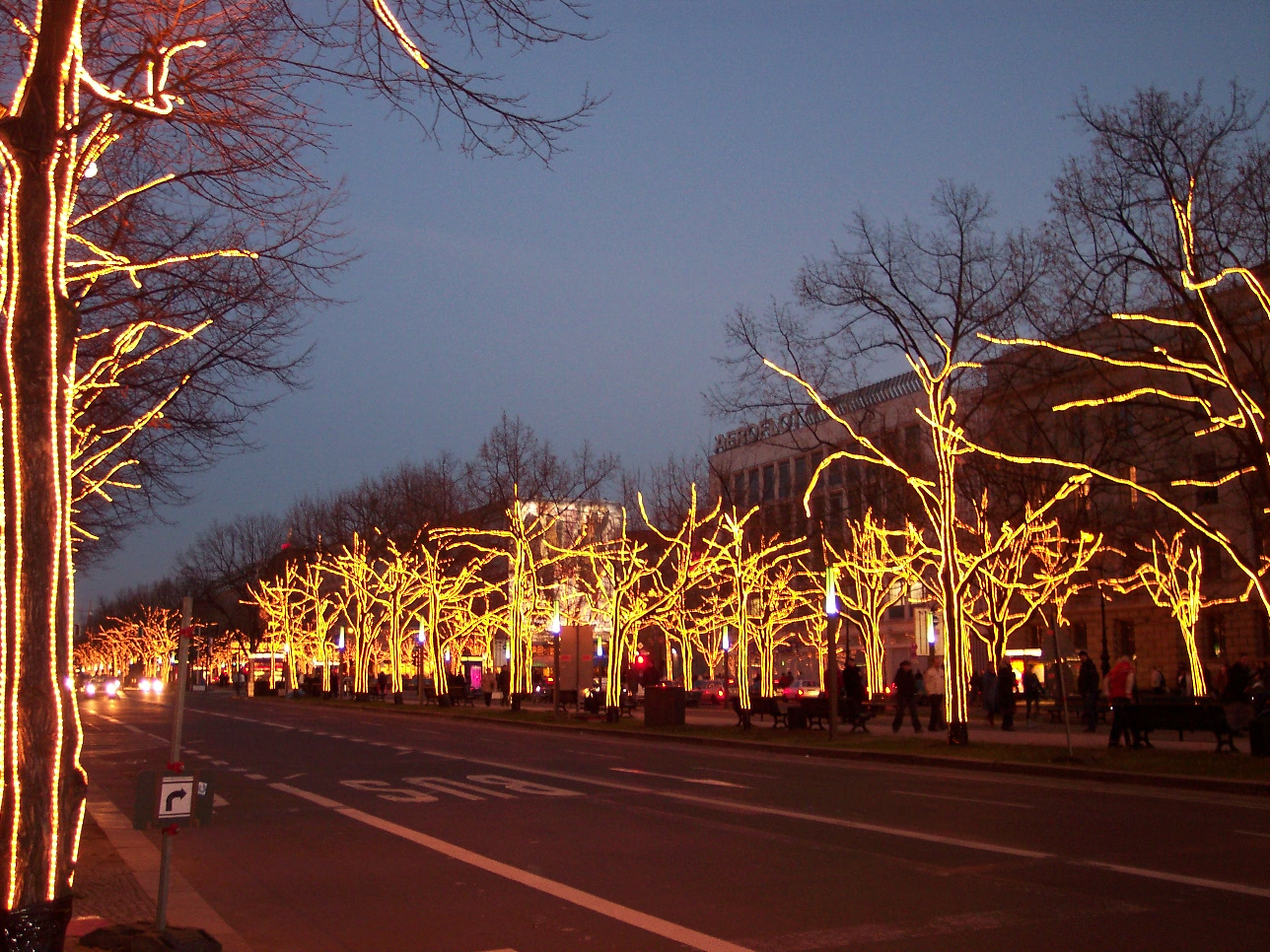
Unter den Linden at Christmas

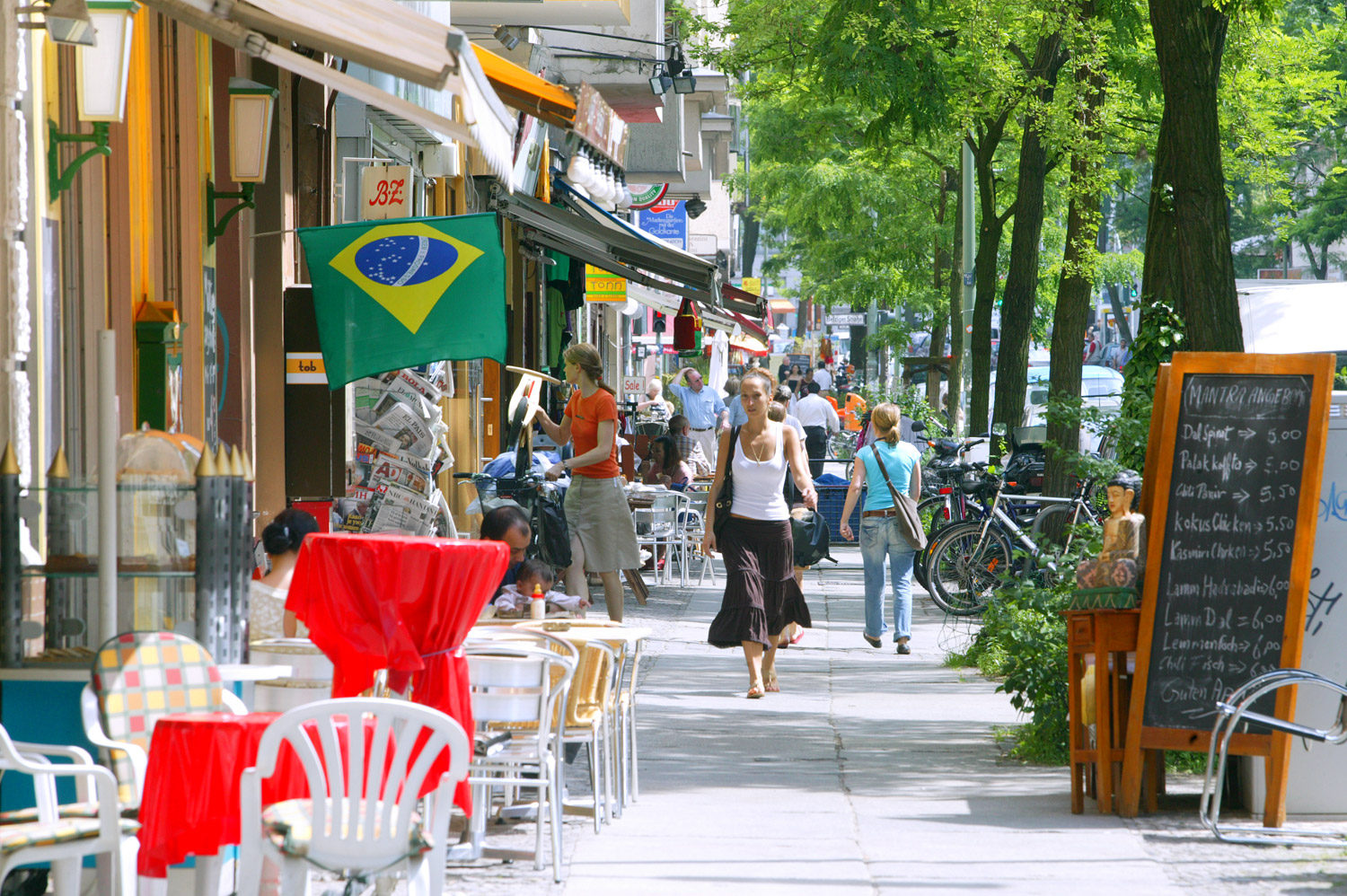
Akazienstraße in Schöneberg

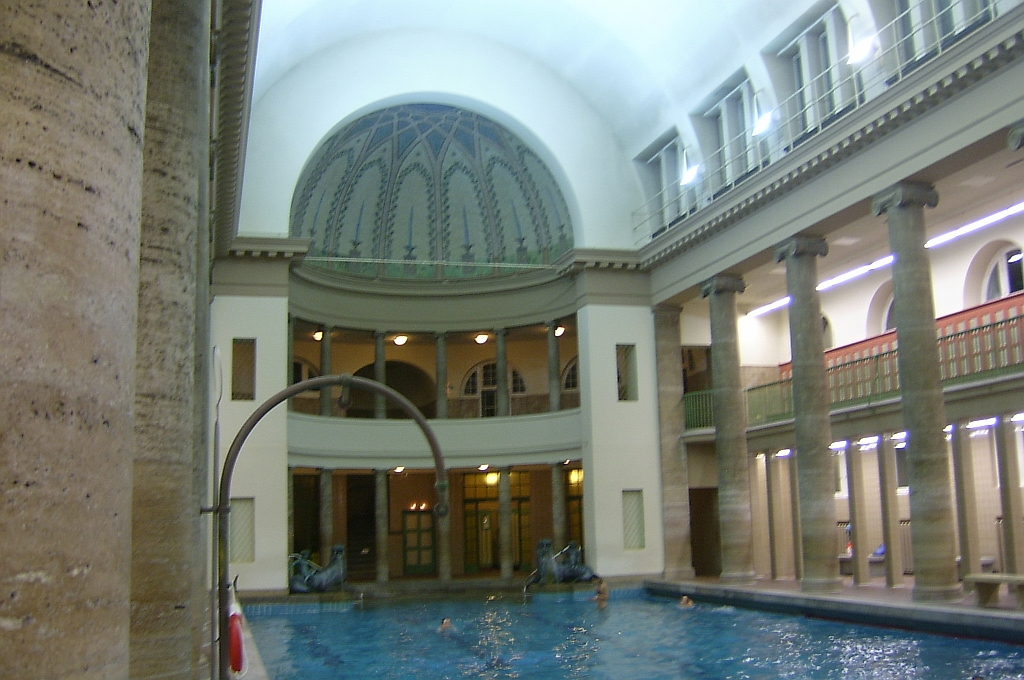
Stadtbad Neukölln

== Parks ==
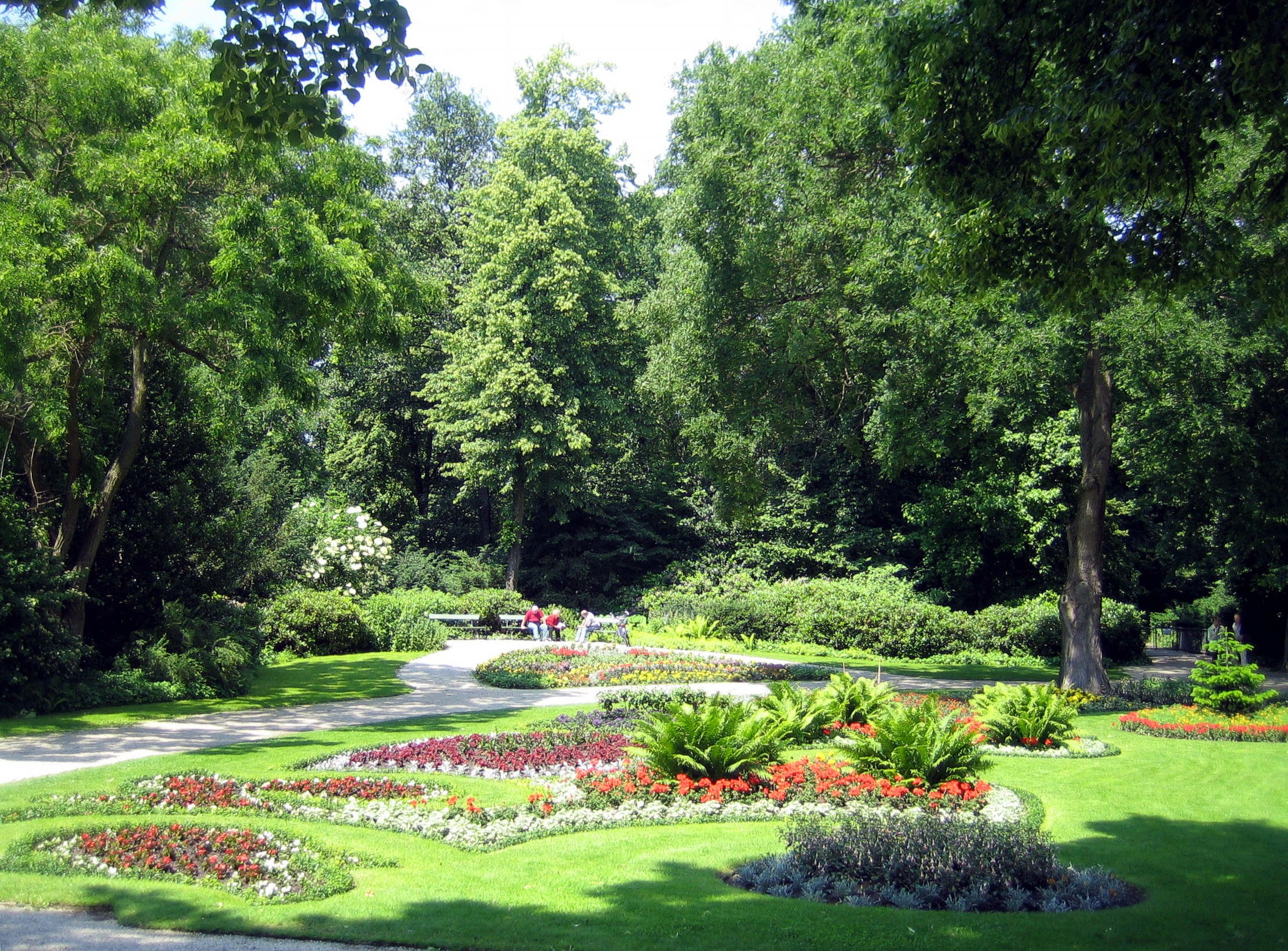
Luiseninsel at Tiergarten

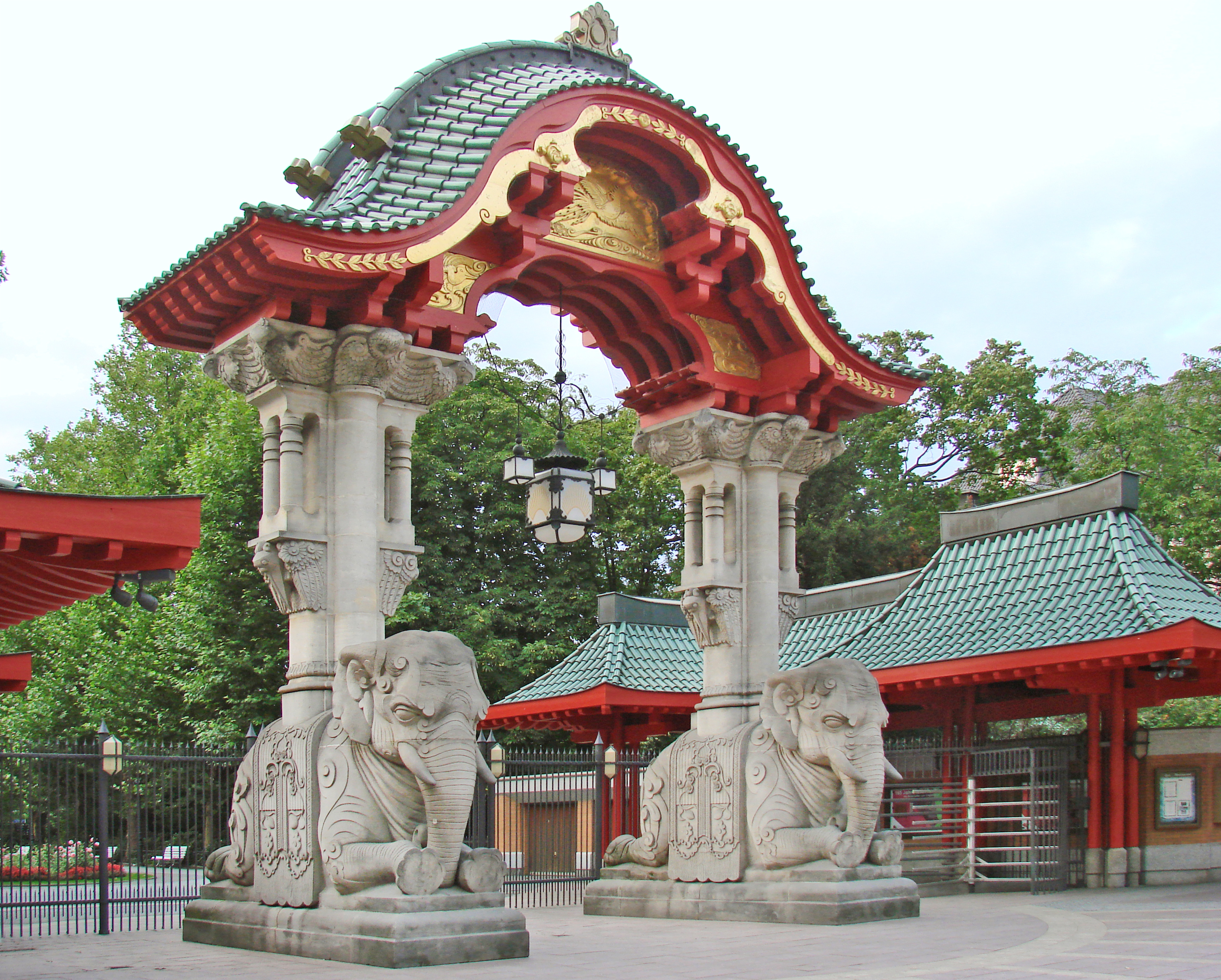
Entrance to Berlin Zoo

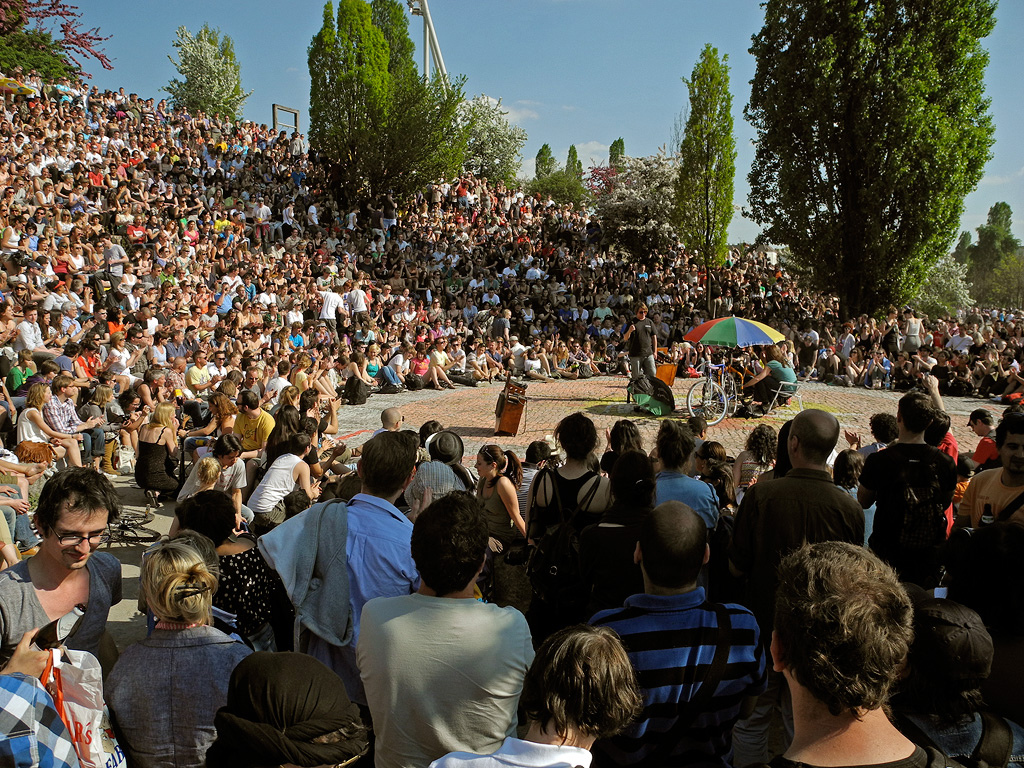
Karaoke at Mauerpark

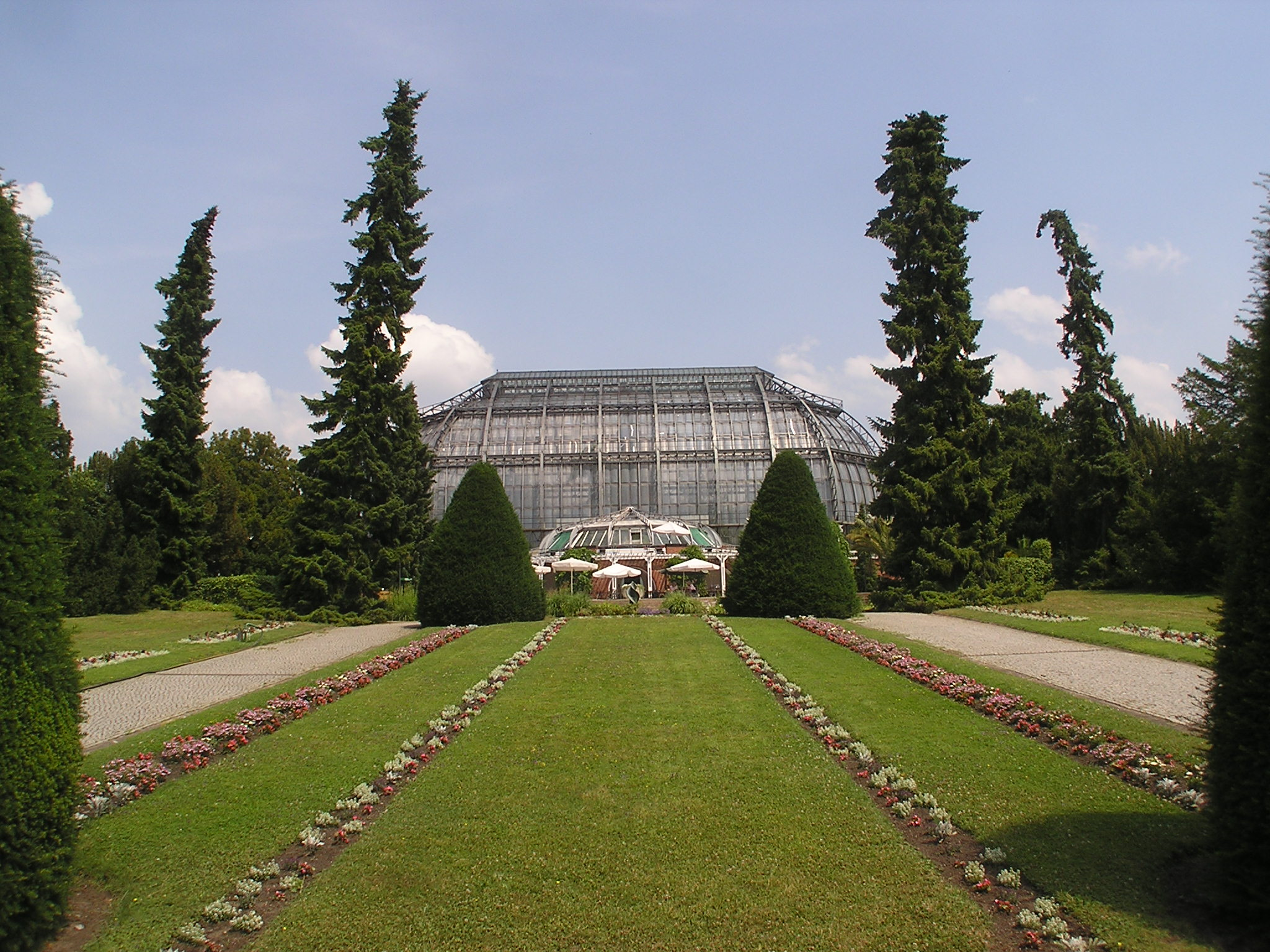
Tropical House at the Botanical Gardens

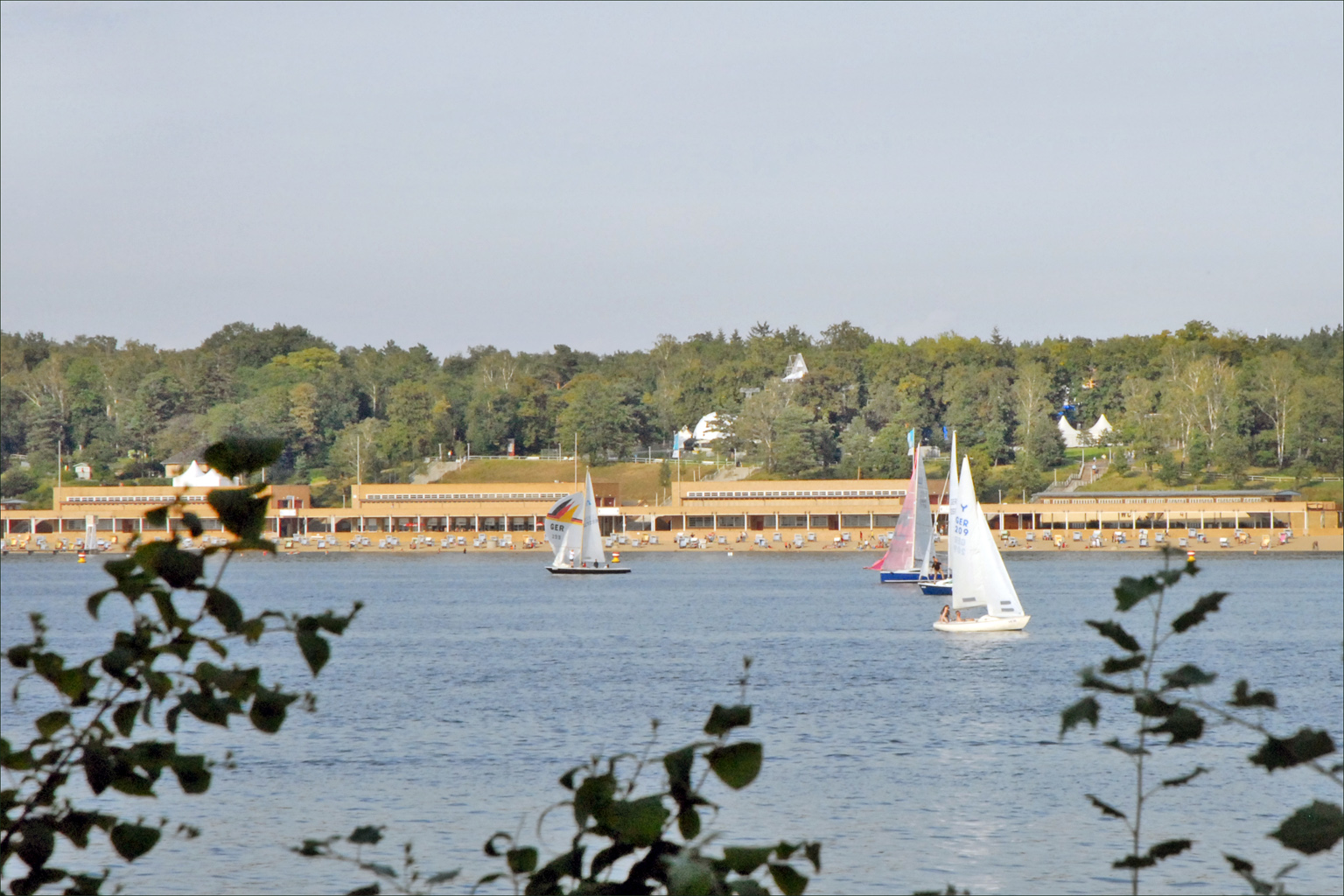
Großer Wannsee

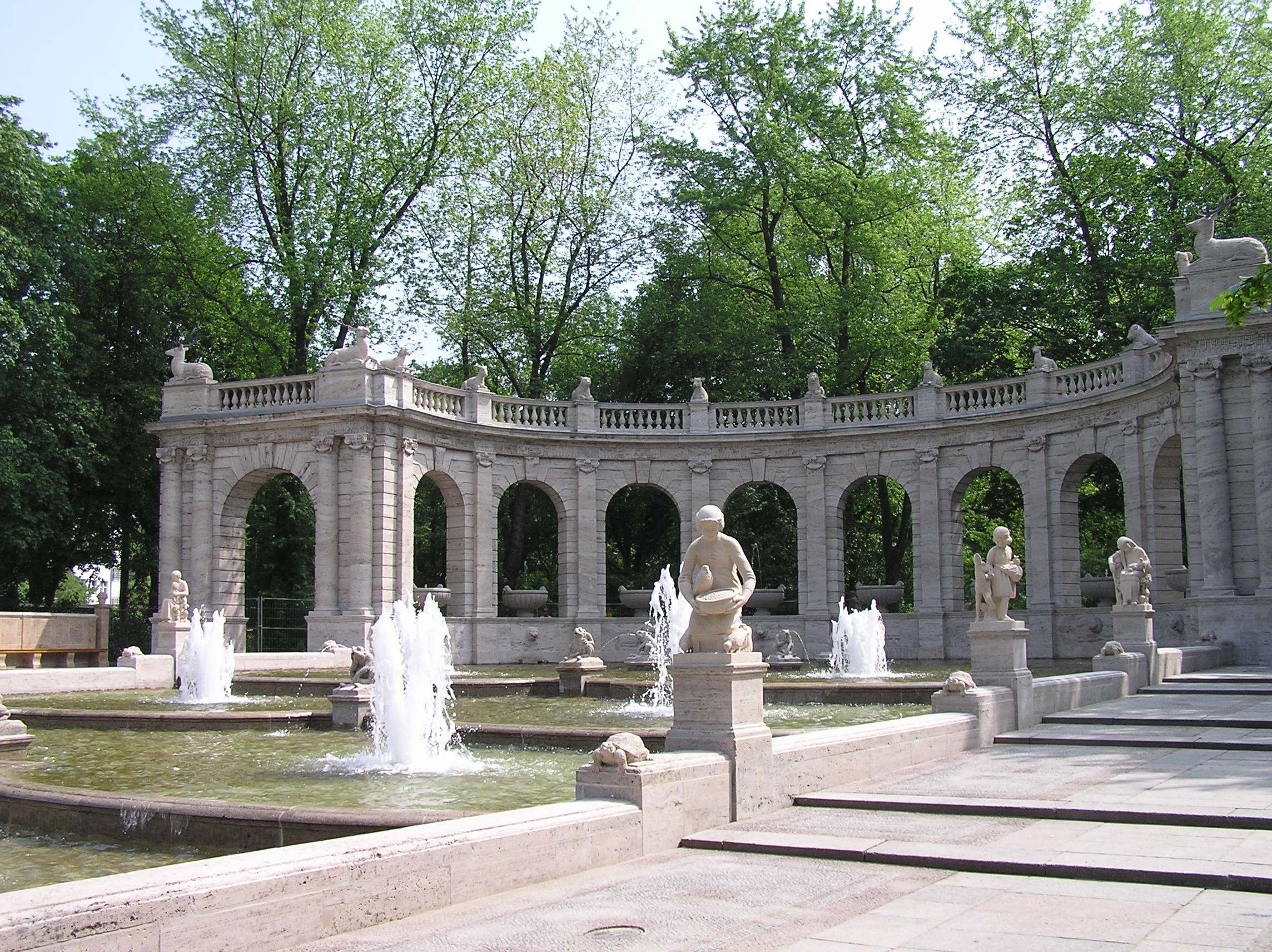
Volkspark Friedrichshain

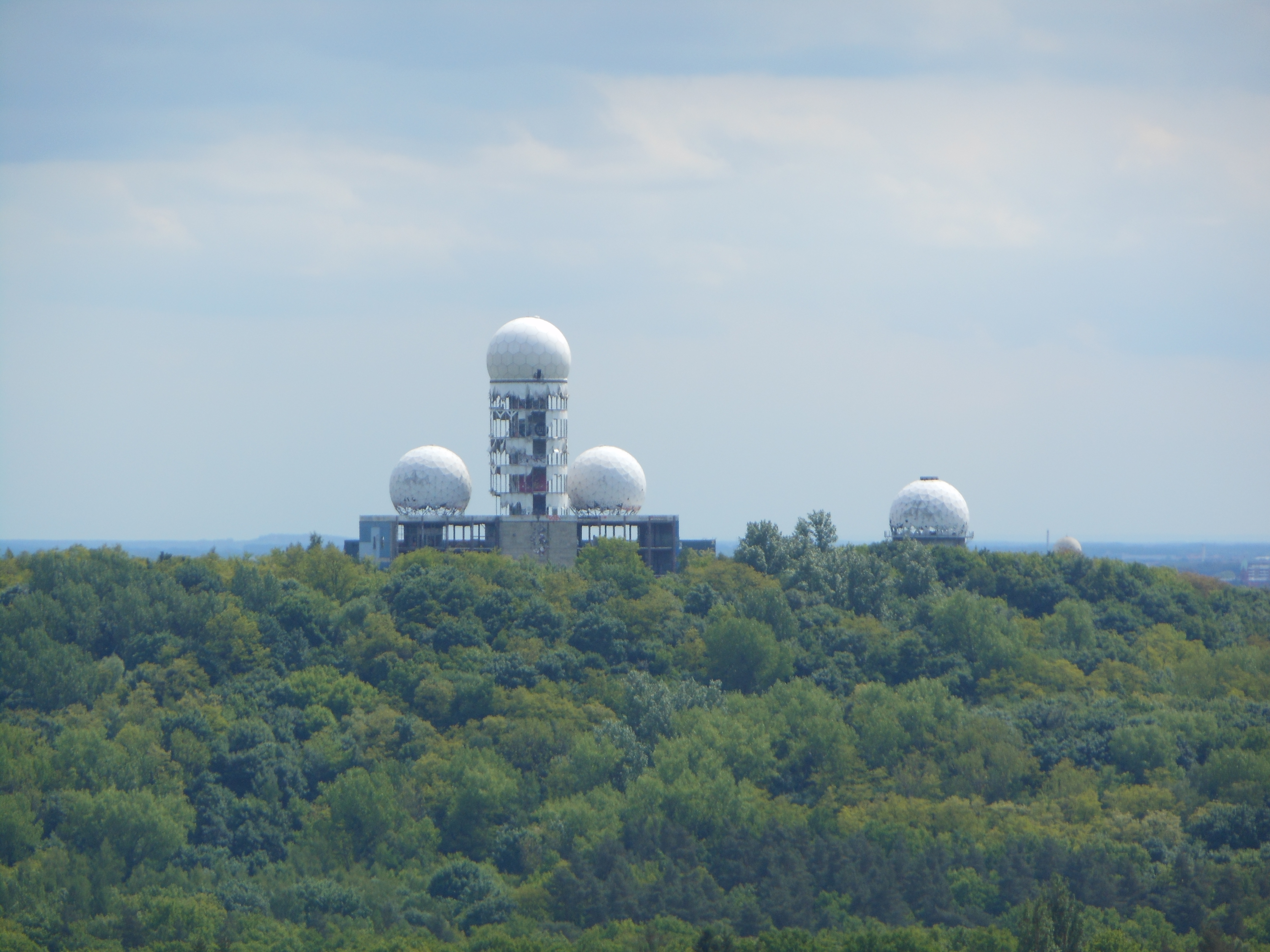
Teufelsberg

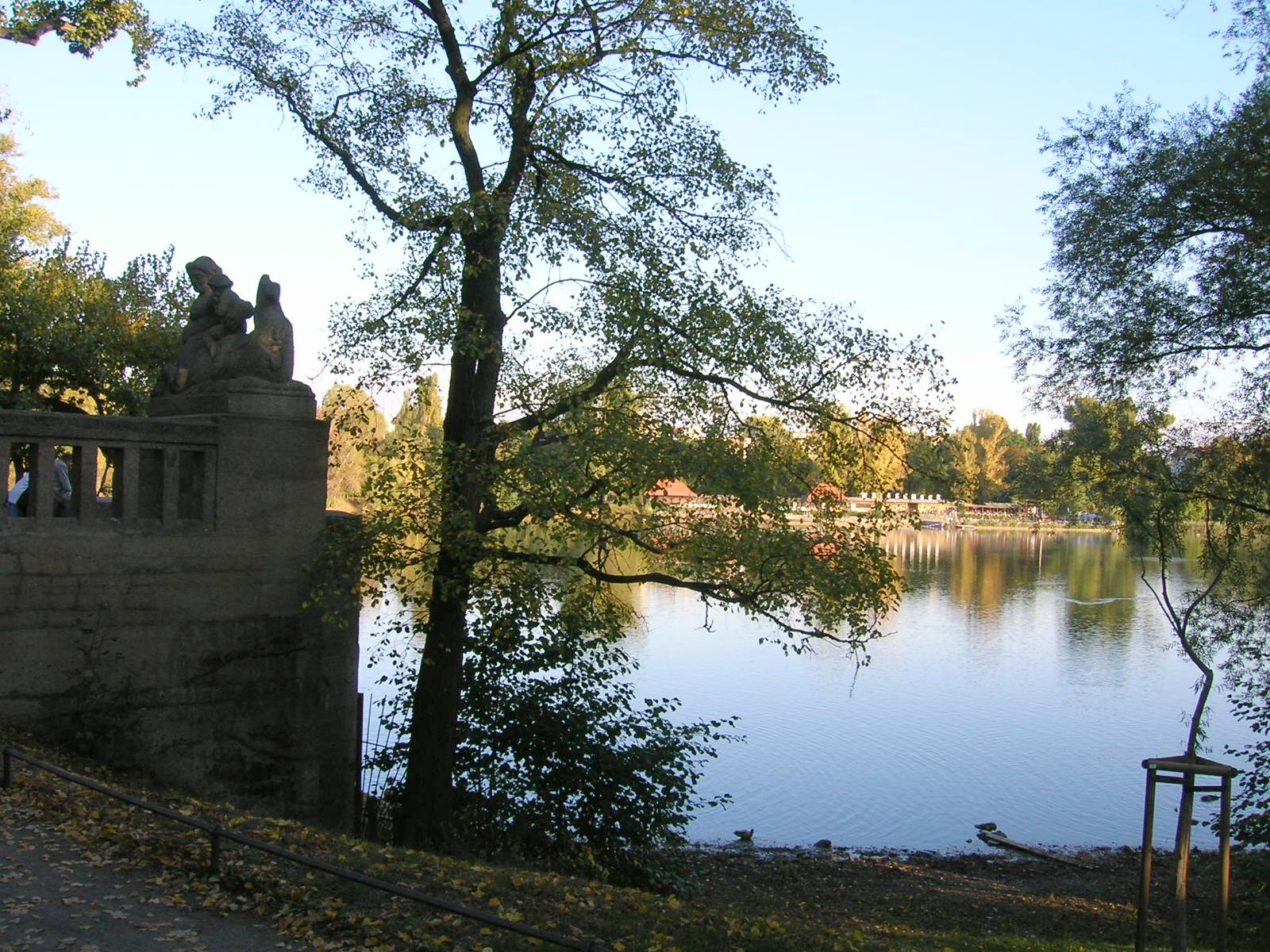
Weißer See in Weißensee

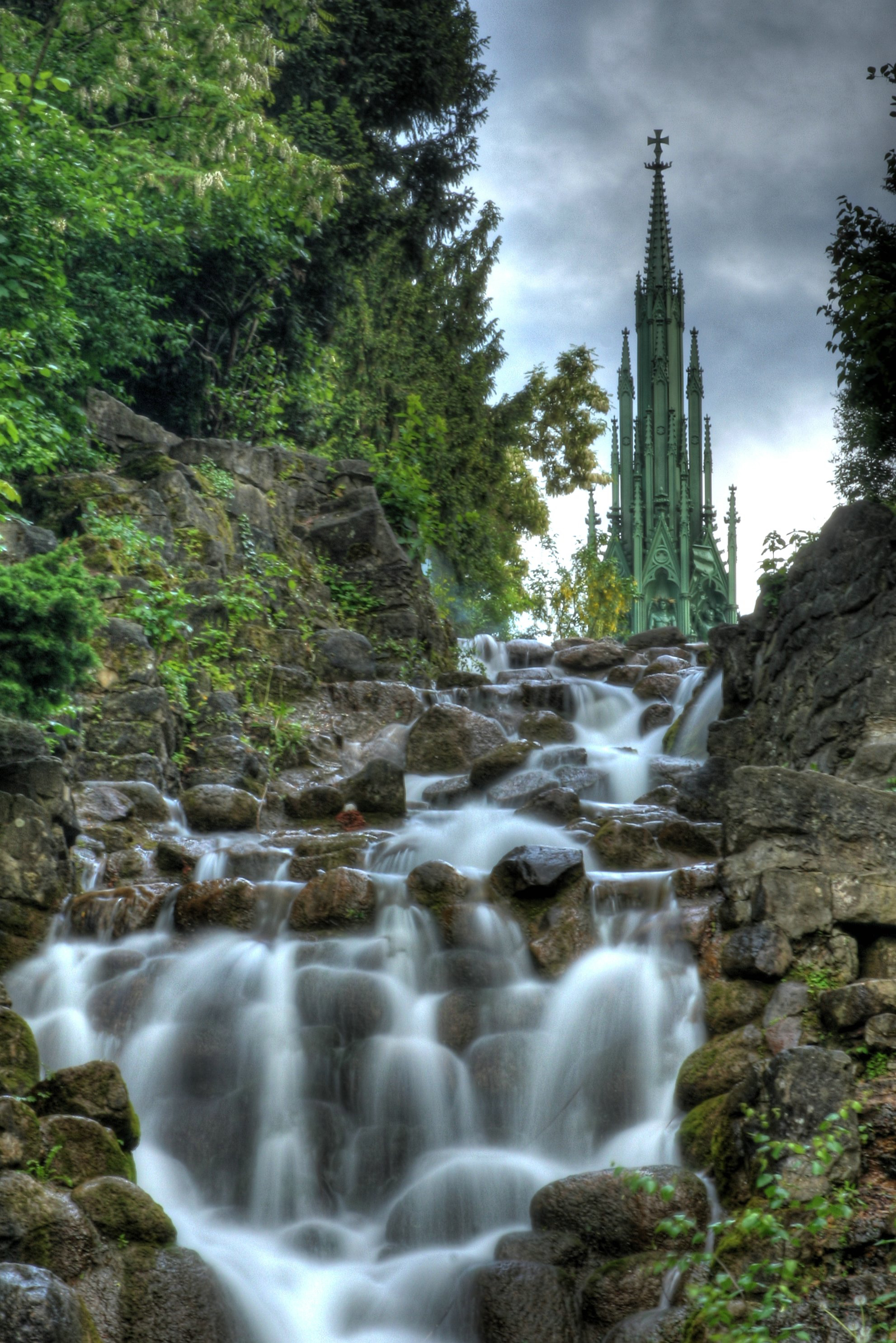
Victoria Park on Kreuzberg

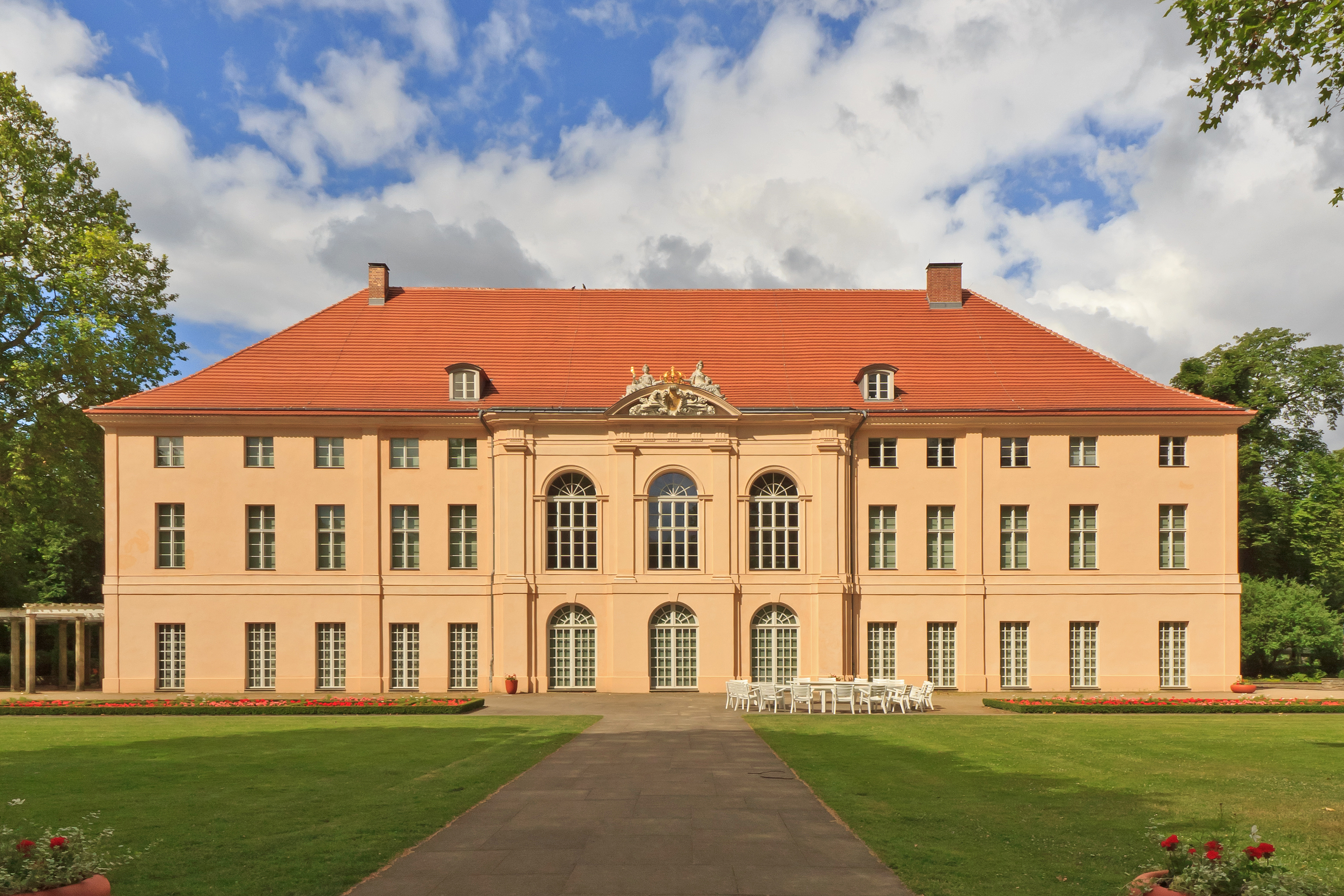
Schlosspark Schönhausen

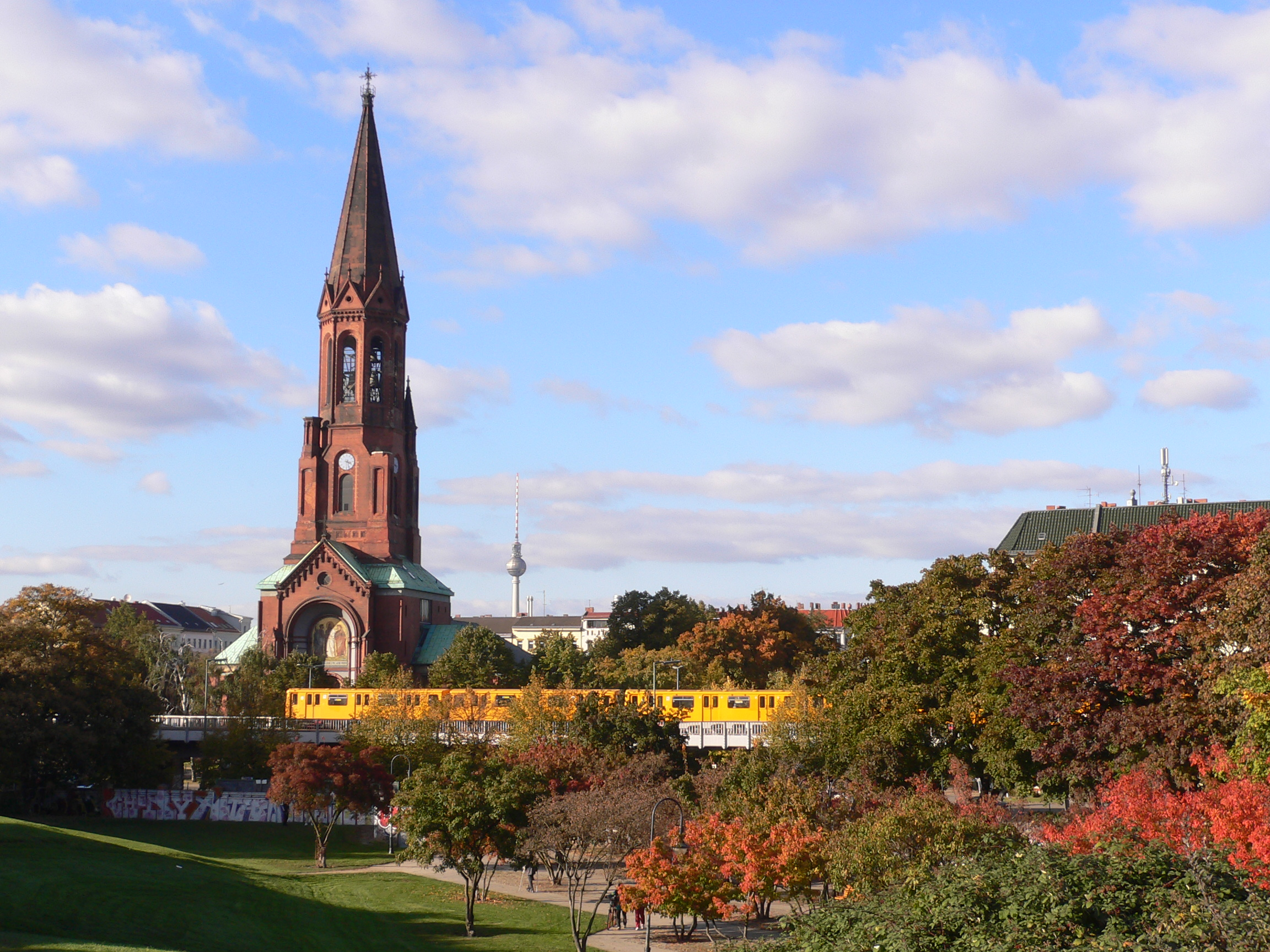
Görlitzer Park

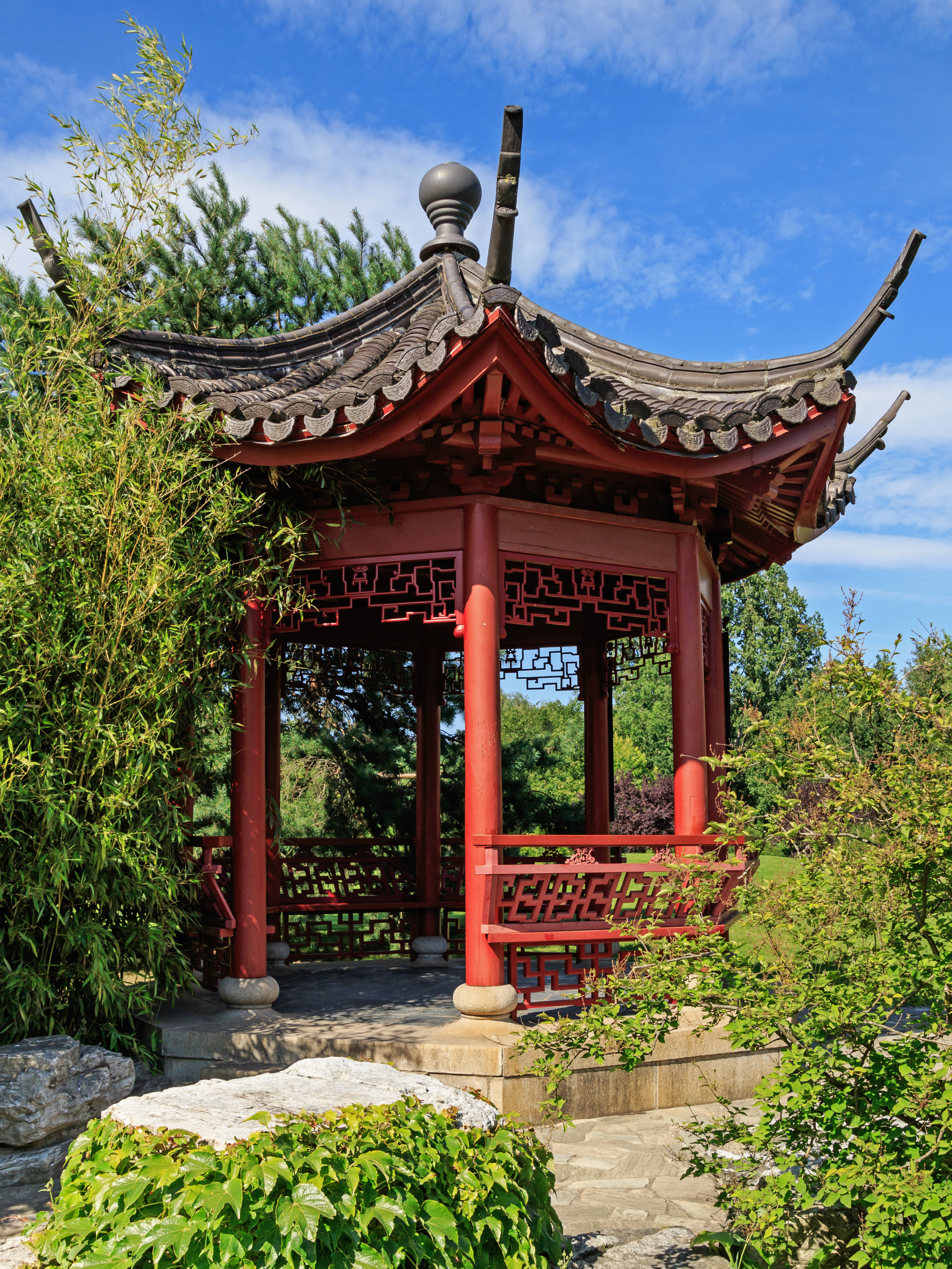
Gardens of the world, Marzahn

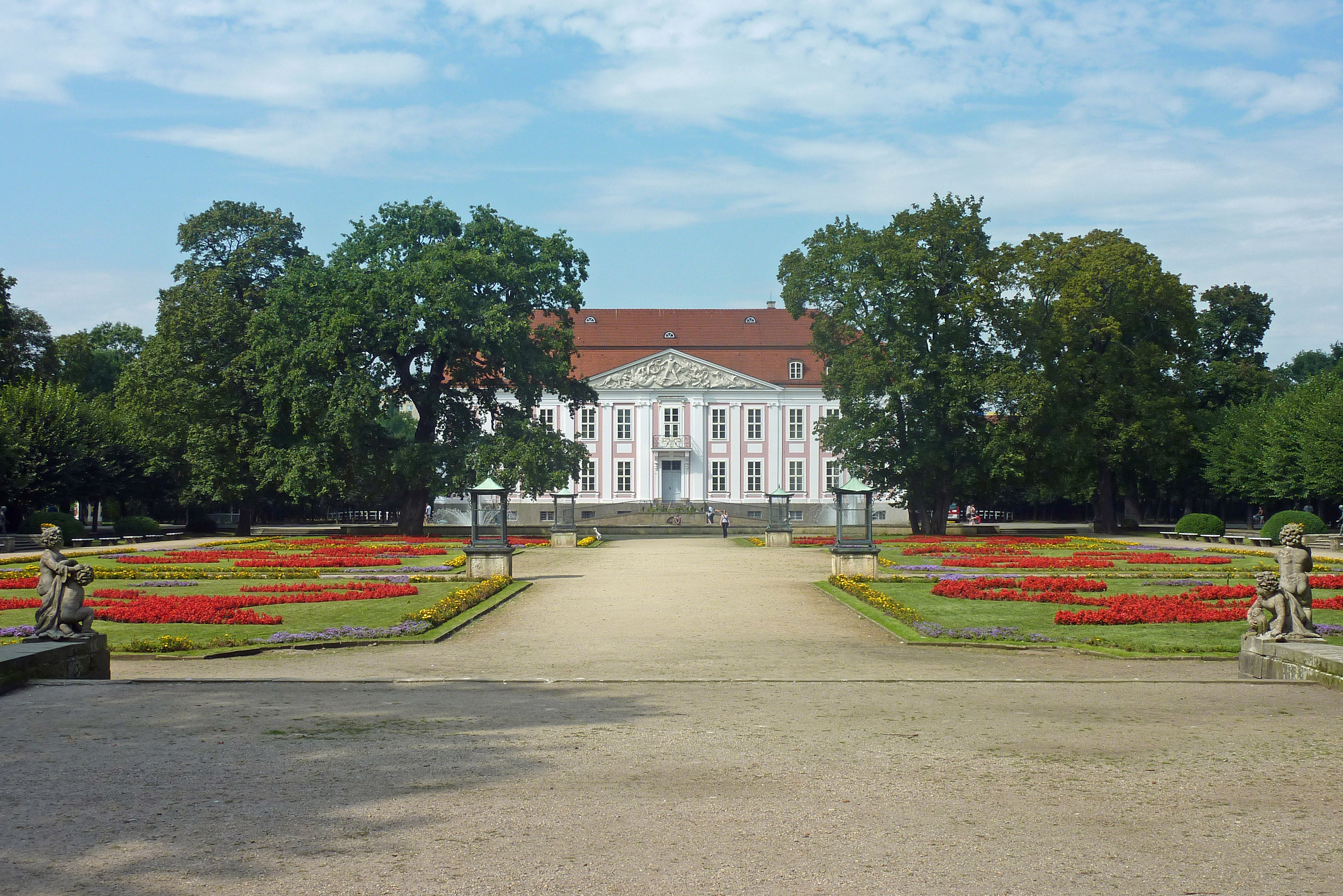
Tierpark Berlin

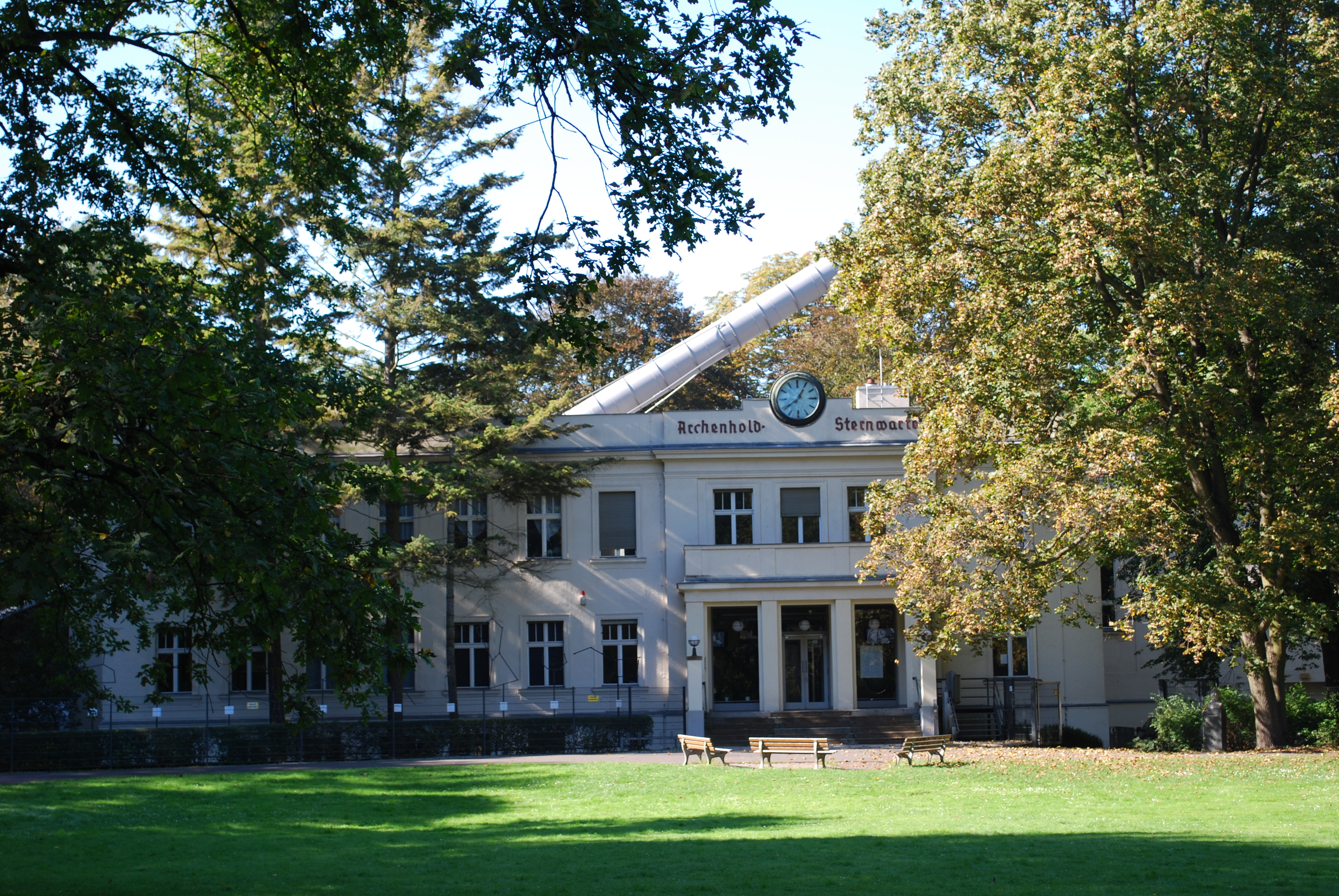
Archenhold Observatory at Treptower Park

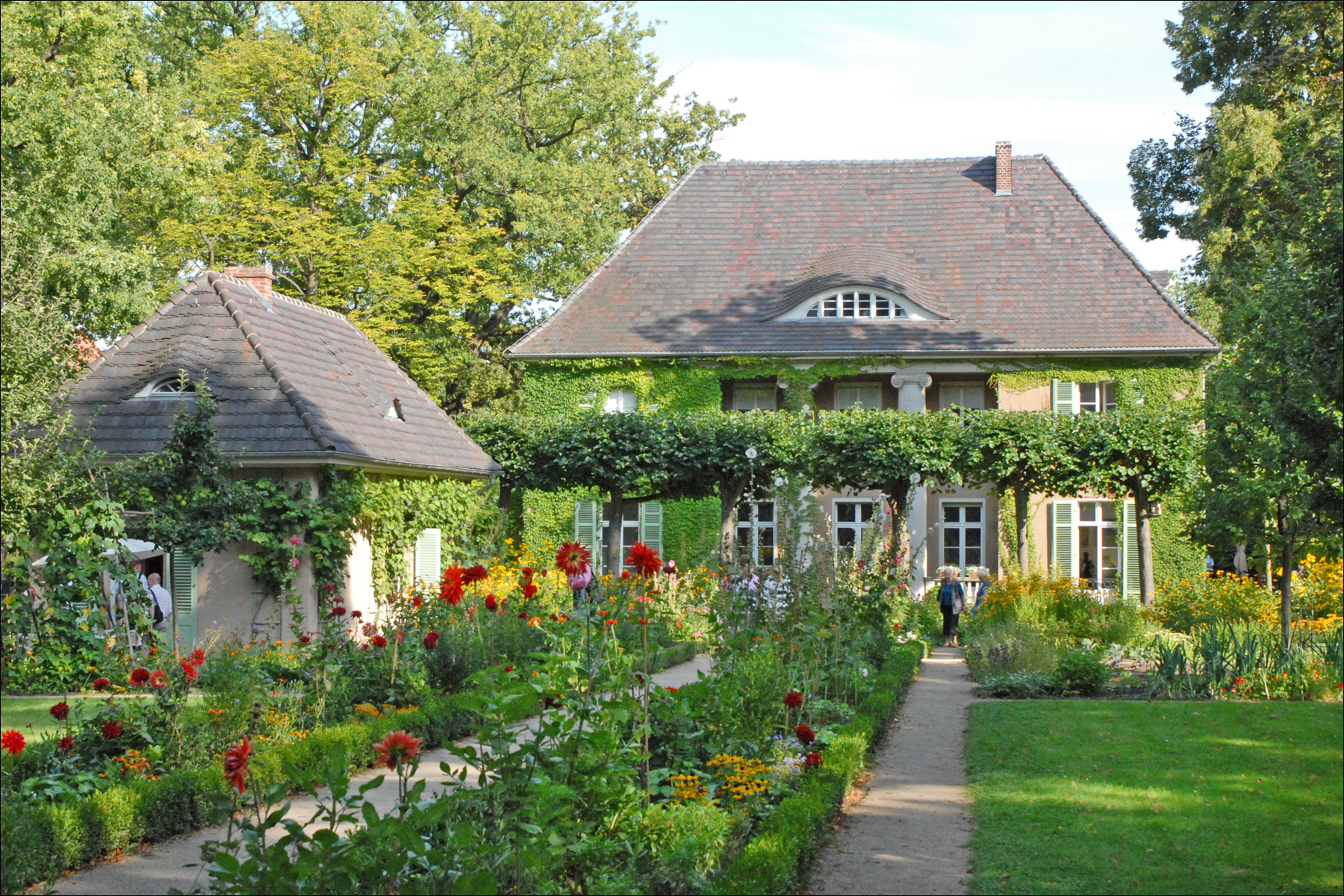
Liebermann Villa

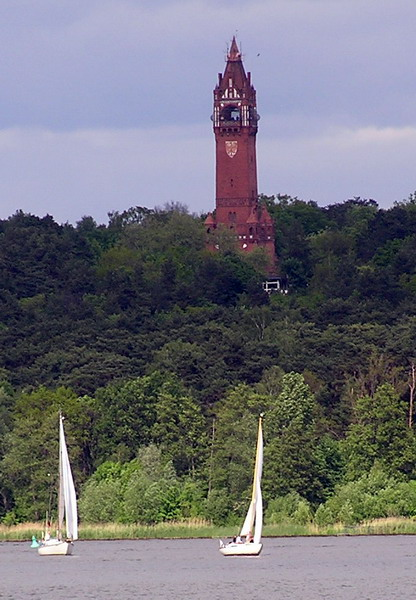
Grunewald Tower

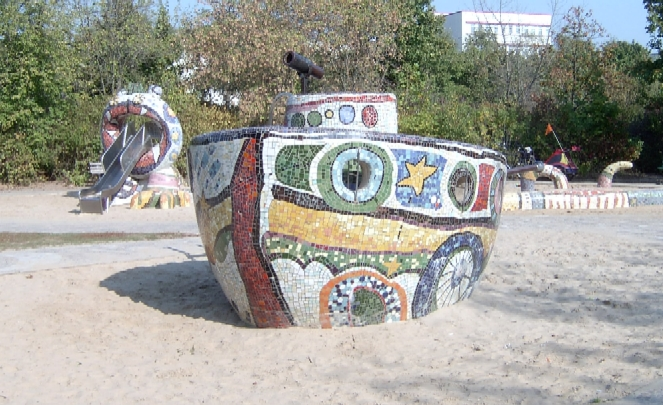
Children's playground at Ernst-Thälmann-Park

== Monuments ==
Brandenburg Gate

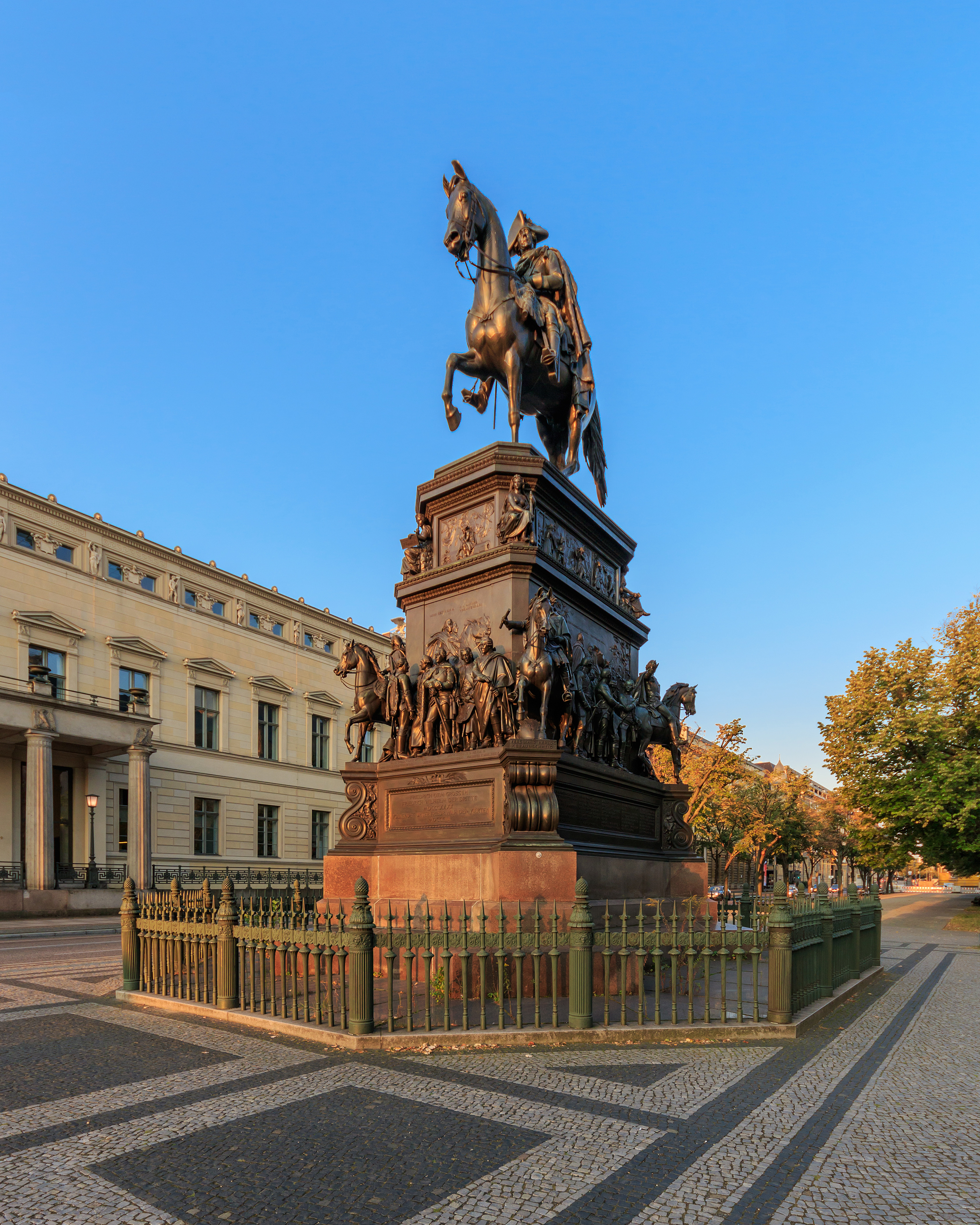
Statue of Frederick the Great

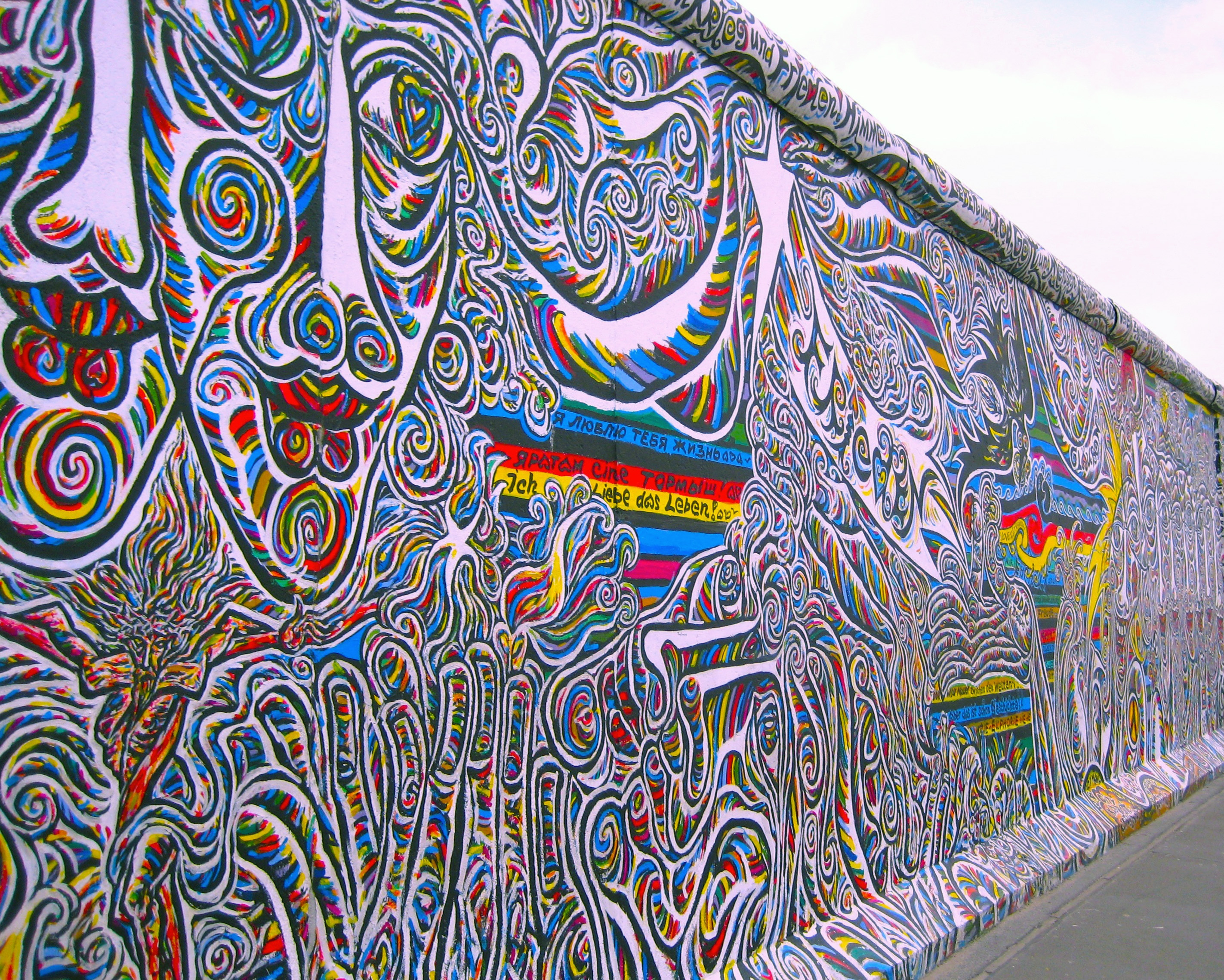
East Side Gallery (former Berlin Wall)

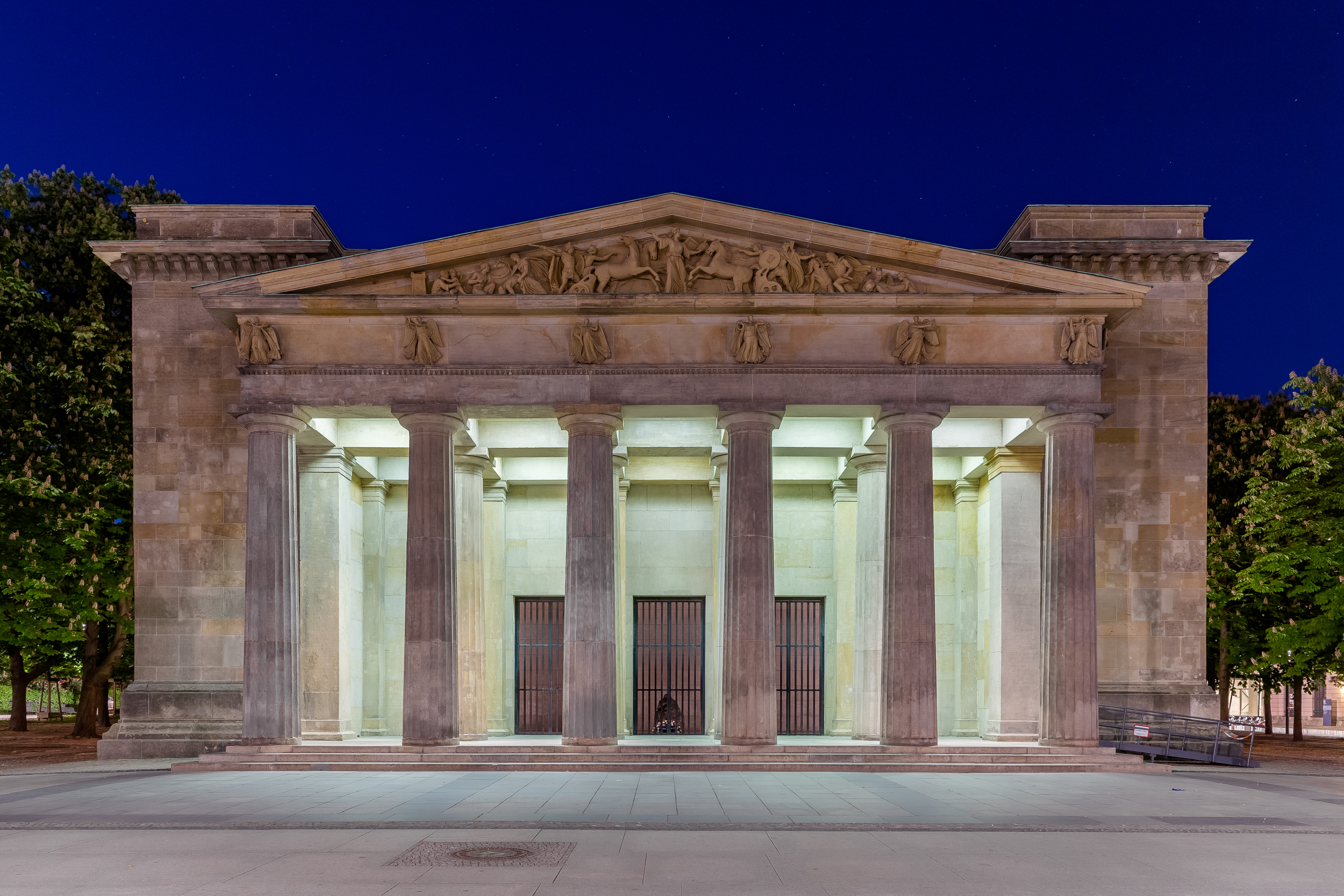
Neue Wache

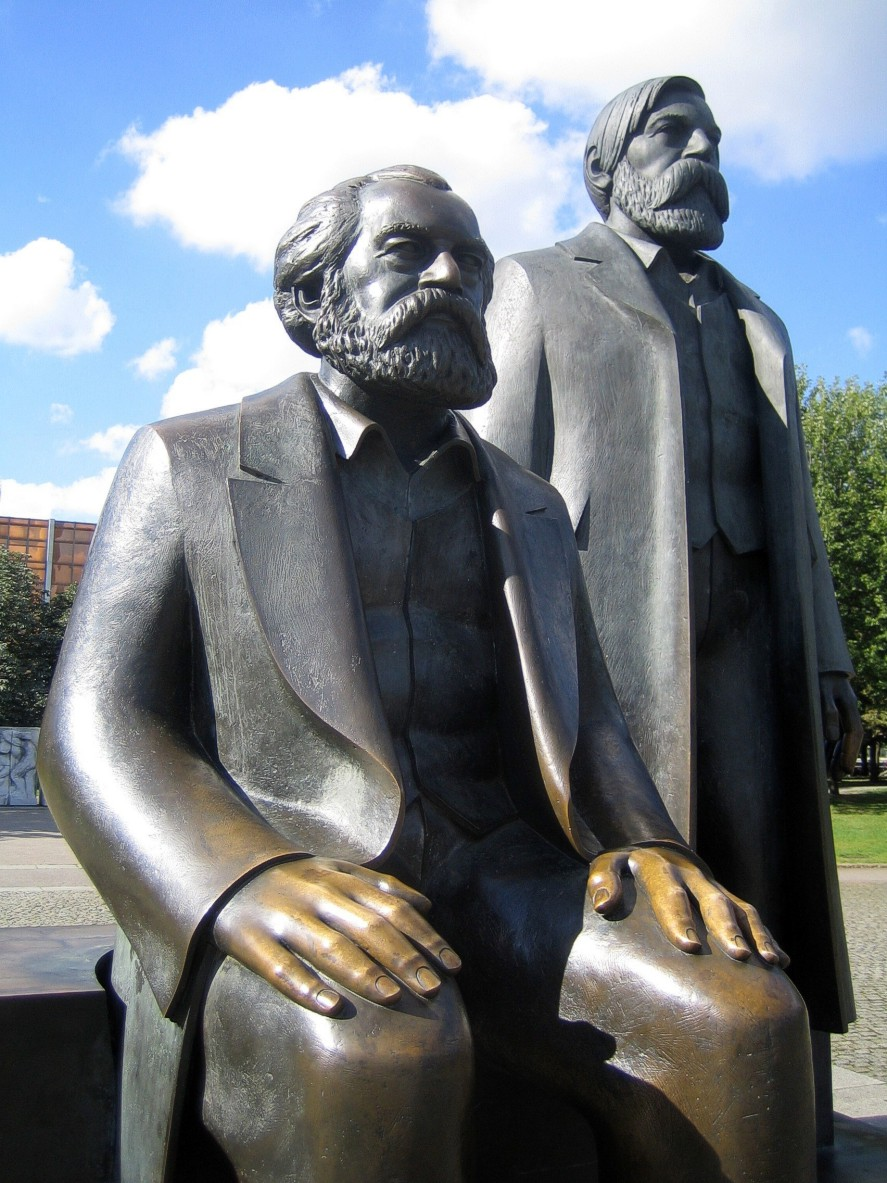
Marx-Engels Forum

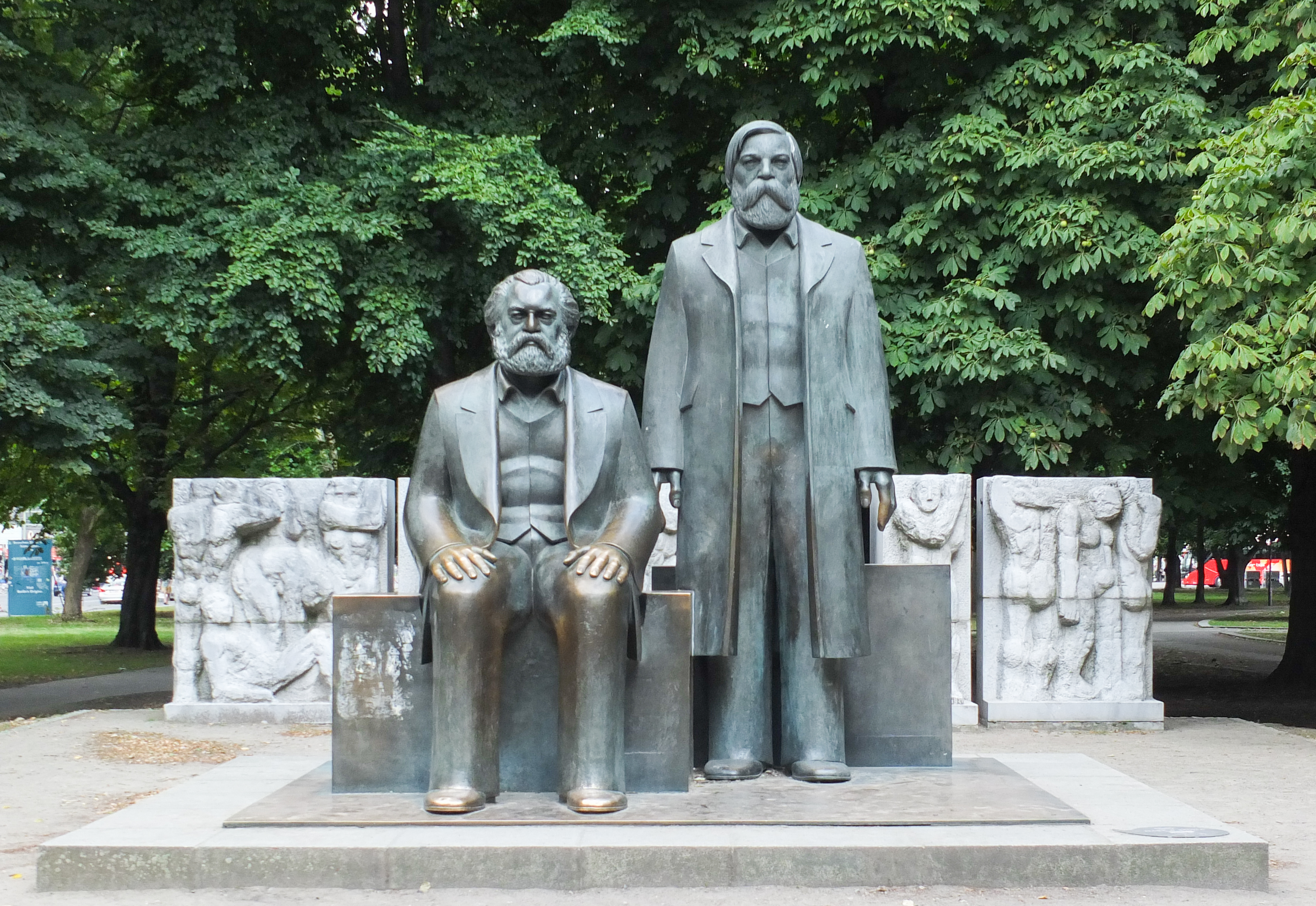
Marx-Engels monument

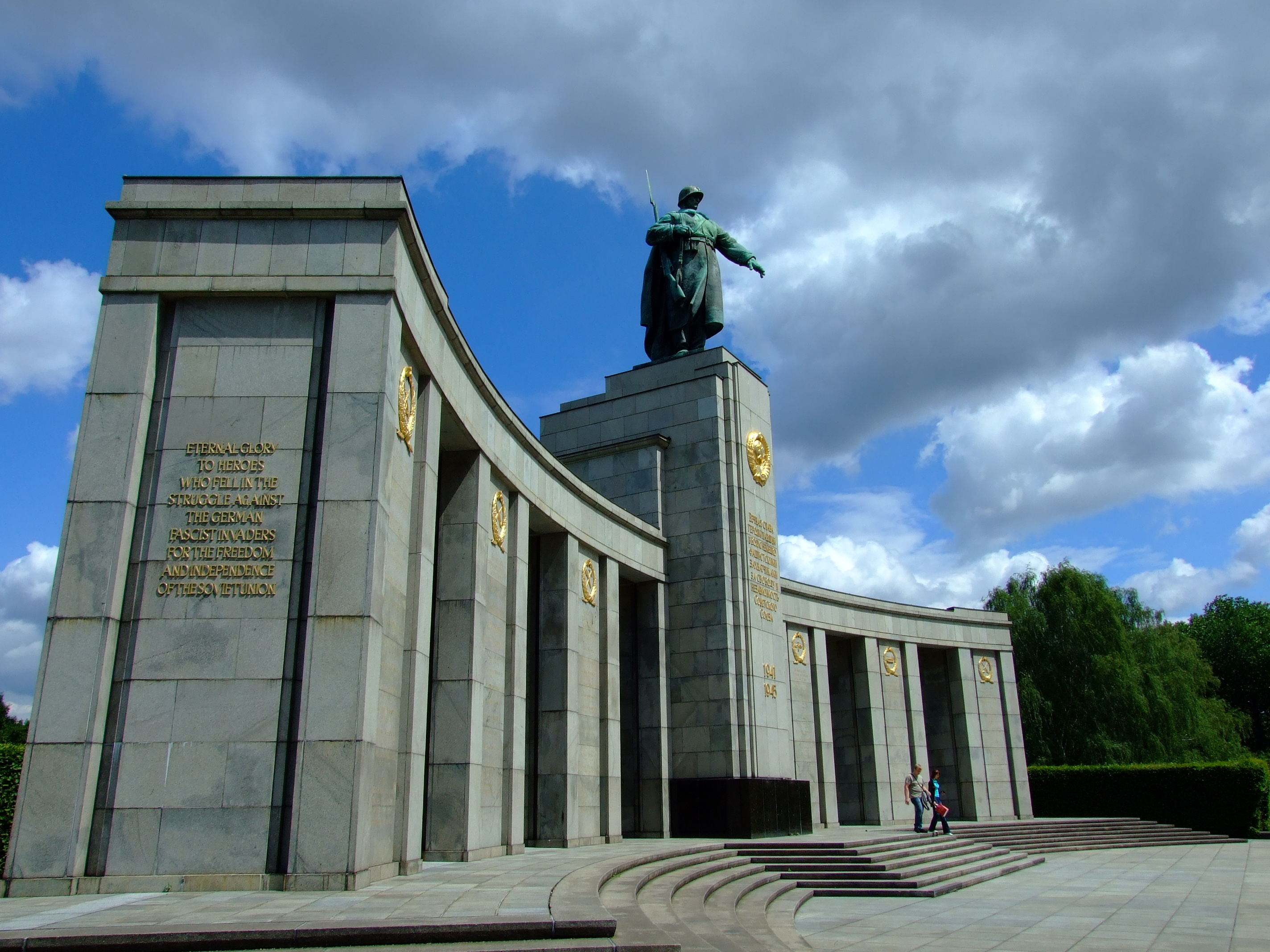
Soviet War Memorial, Tiergarten

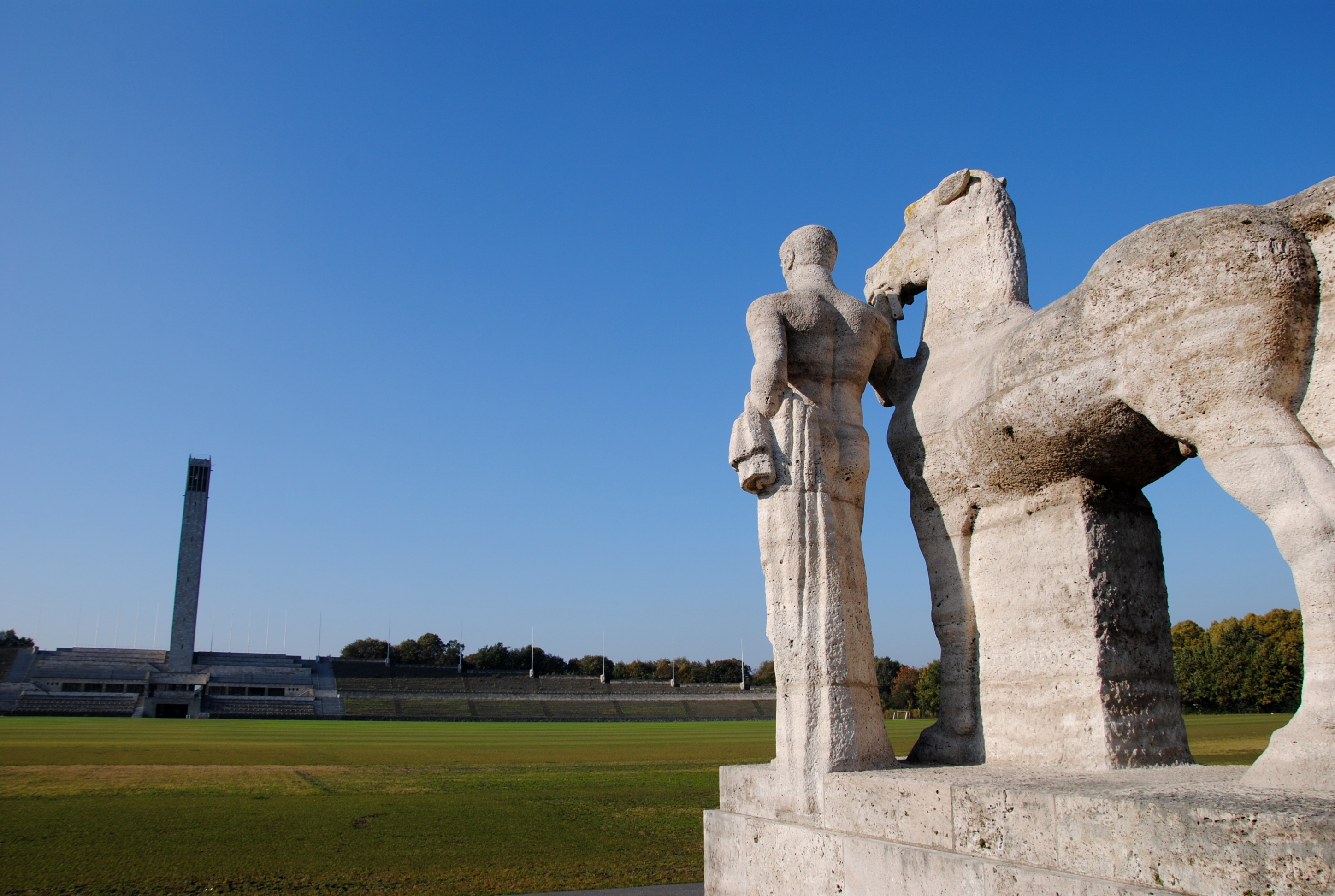
Statue and Bell Tower at Olympiastadion

Beethoven-Haydn-Mozart Memorial

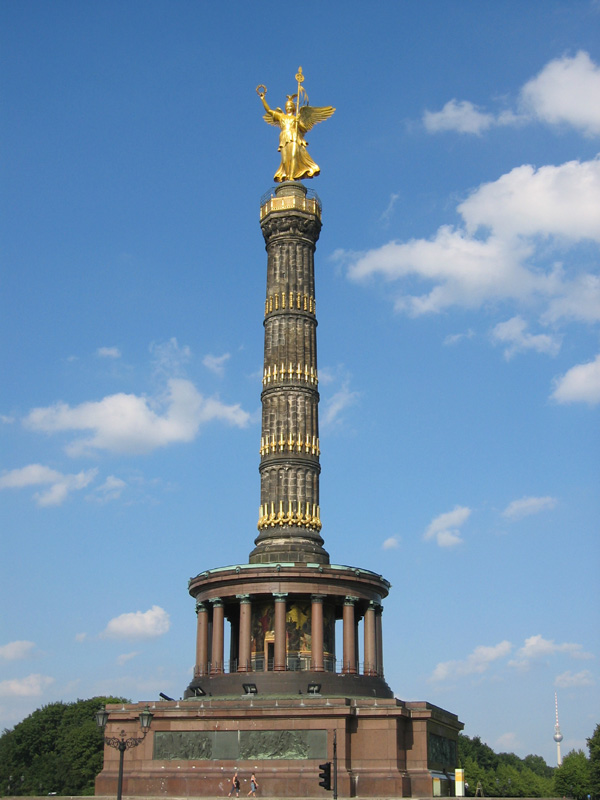
Berlin Victory Column

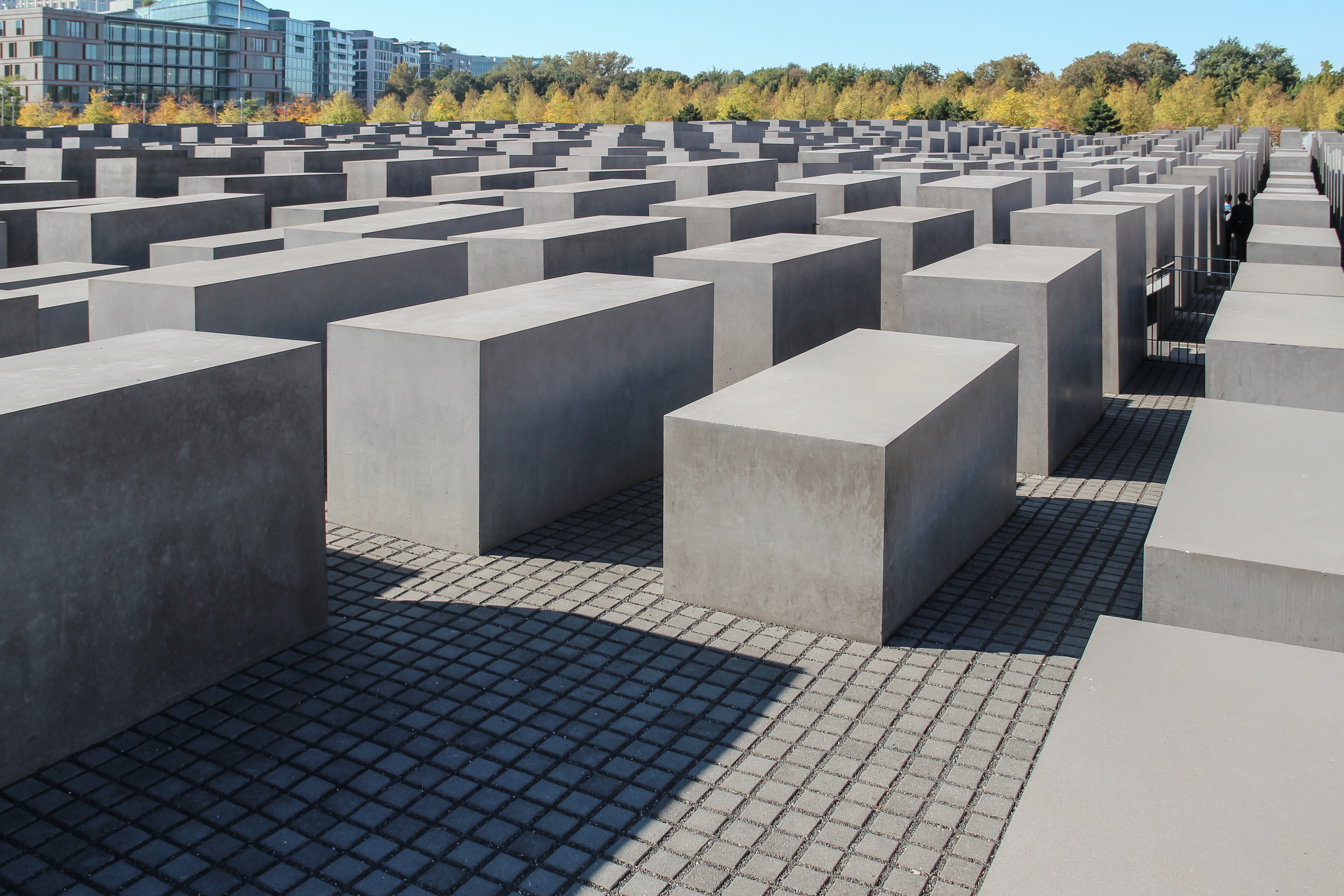
Holocaust Memorial

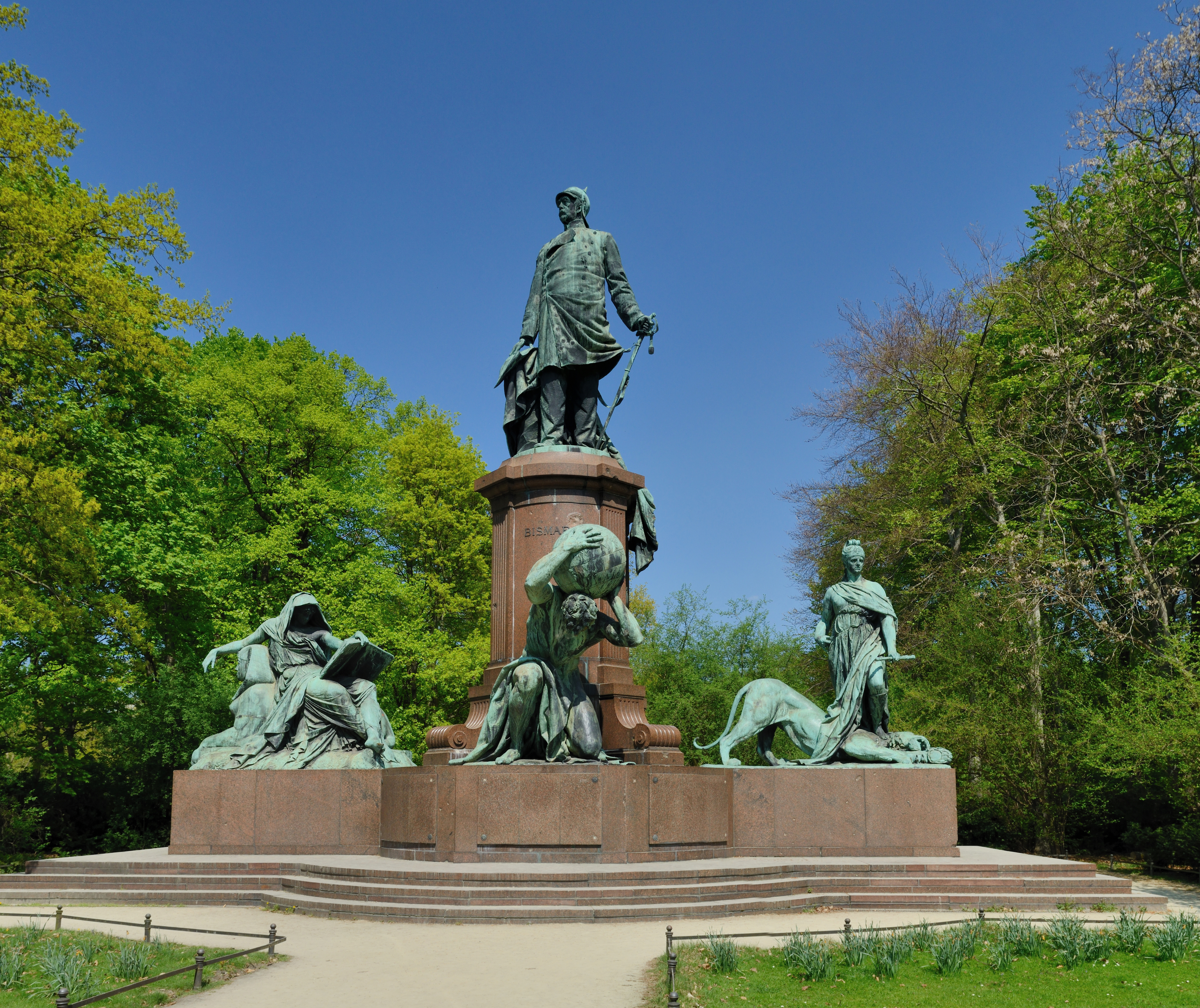
Bismarck Memorial

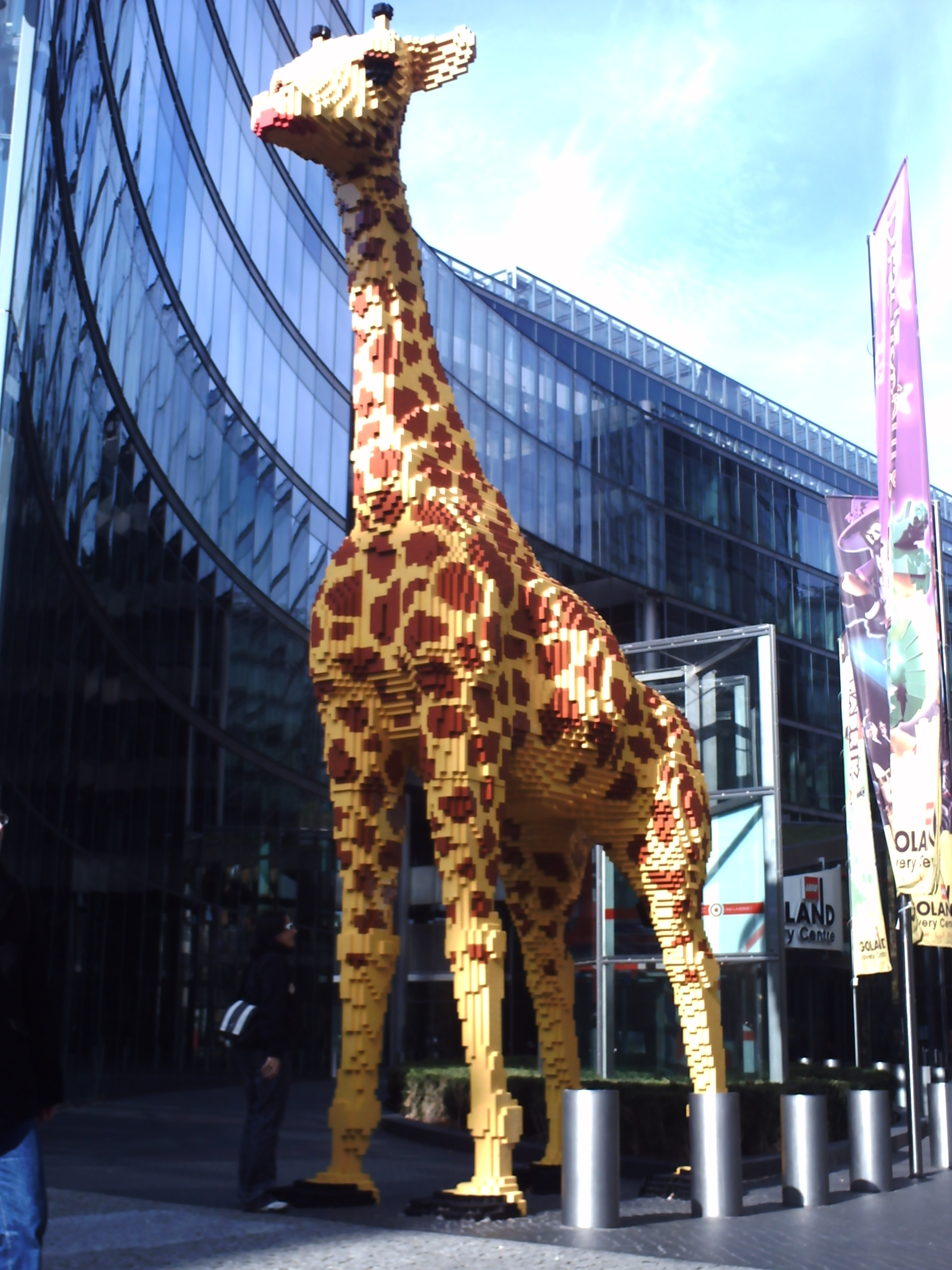
LEGO Giraffe at Sony Center

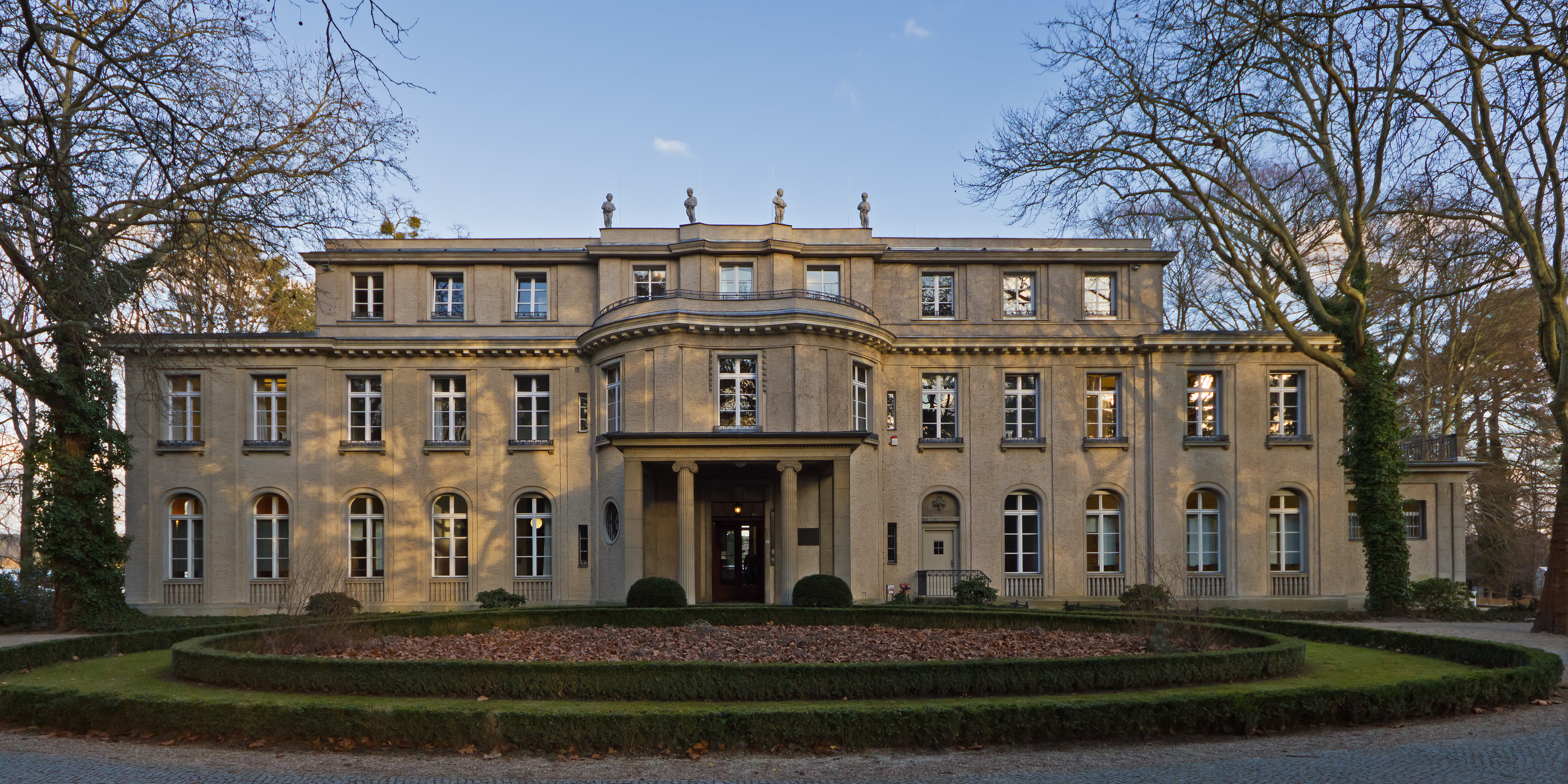
Villa Wannsee Conference

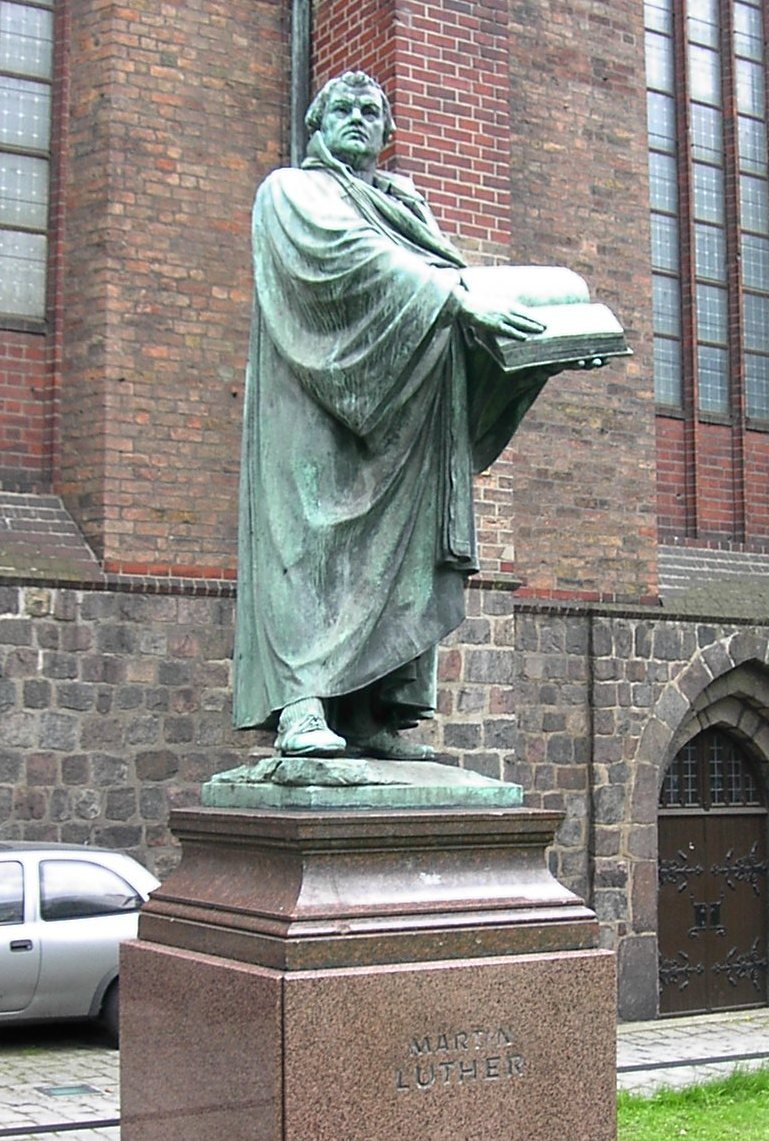
Statue of Martin Luther

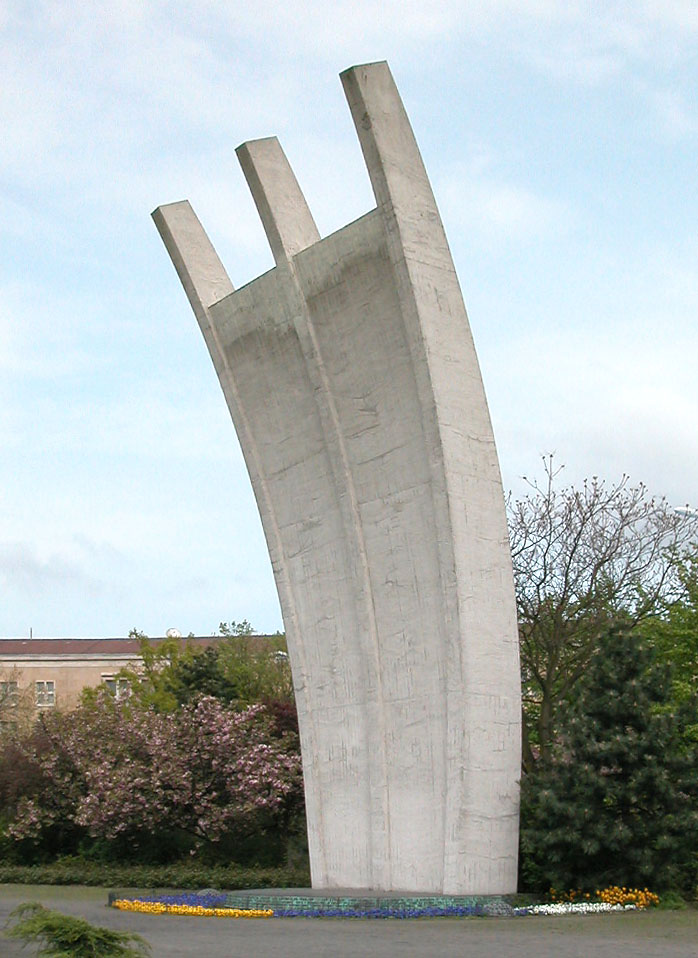
Airlift Monument

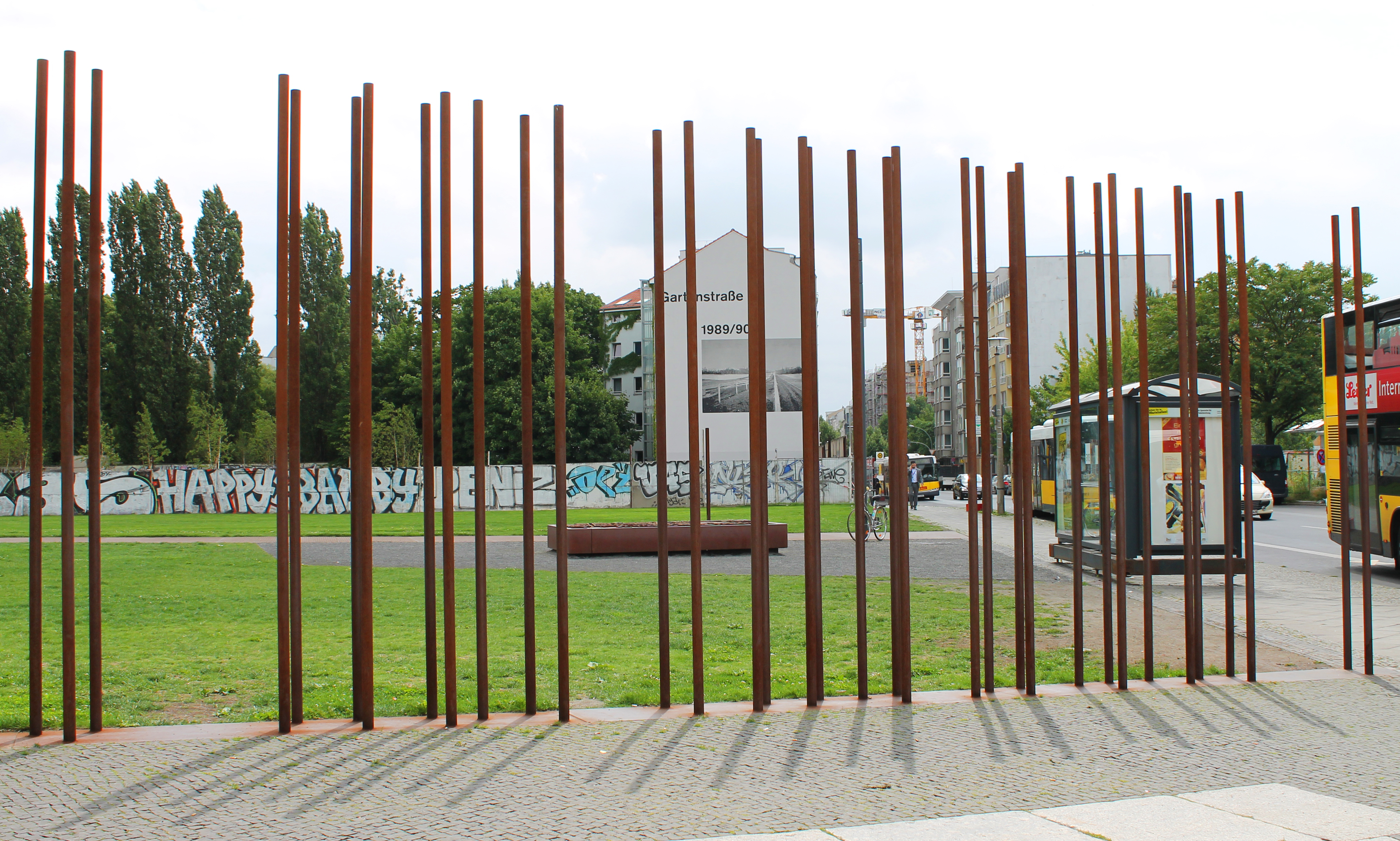
The Berlin Wall Memorial in Bernauer Straße

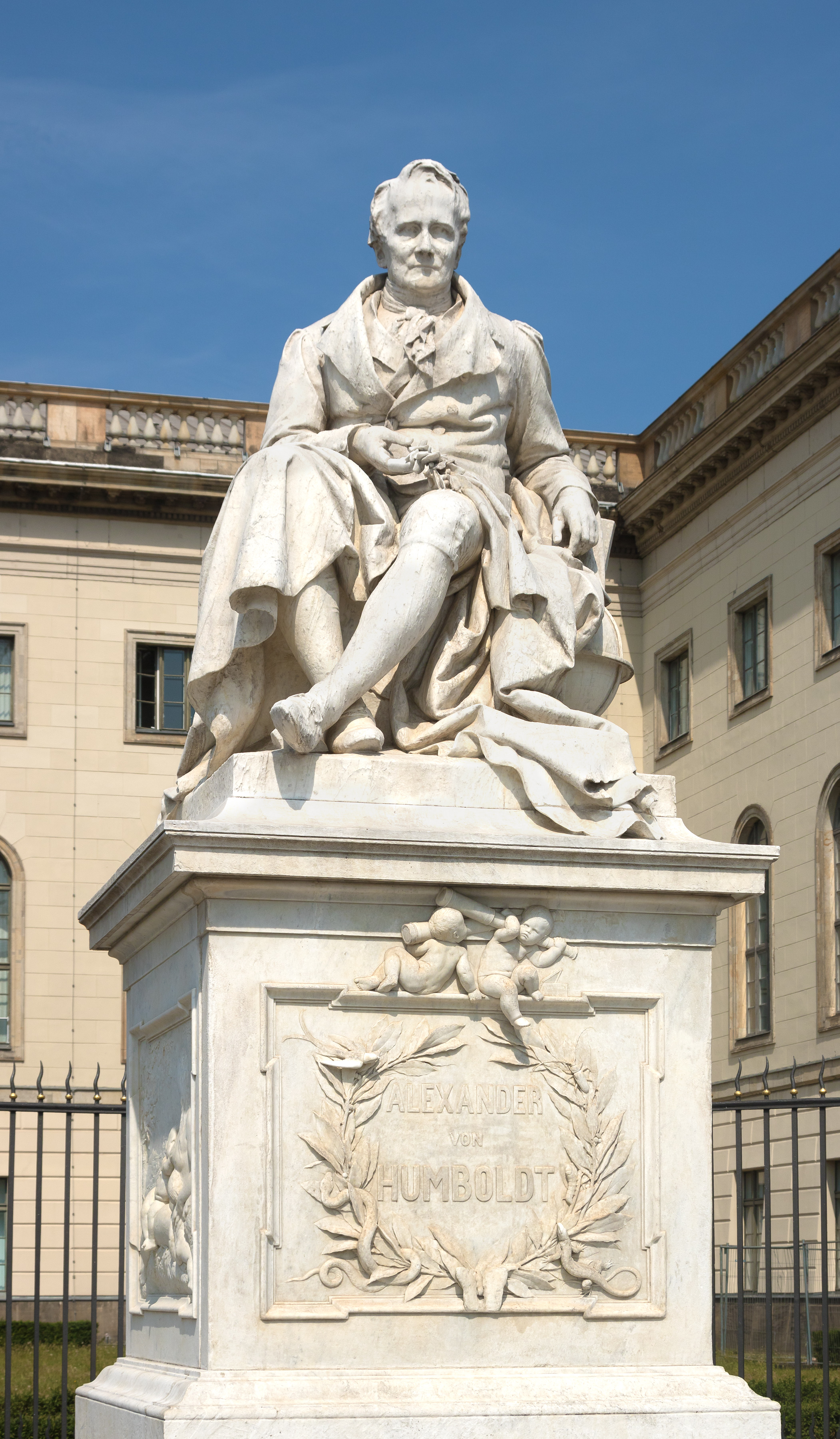
Alexander von Humboldt

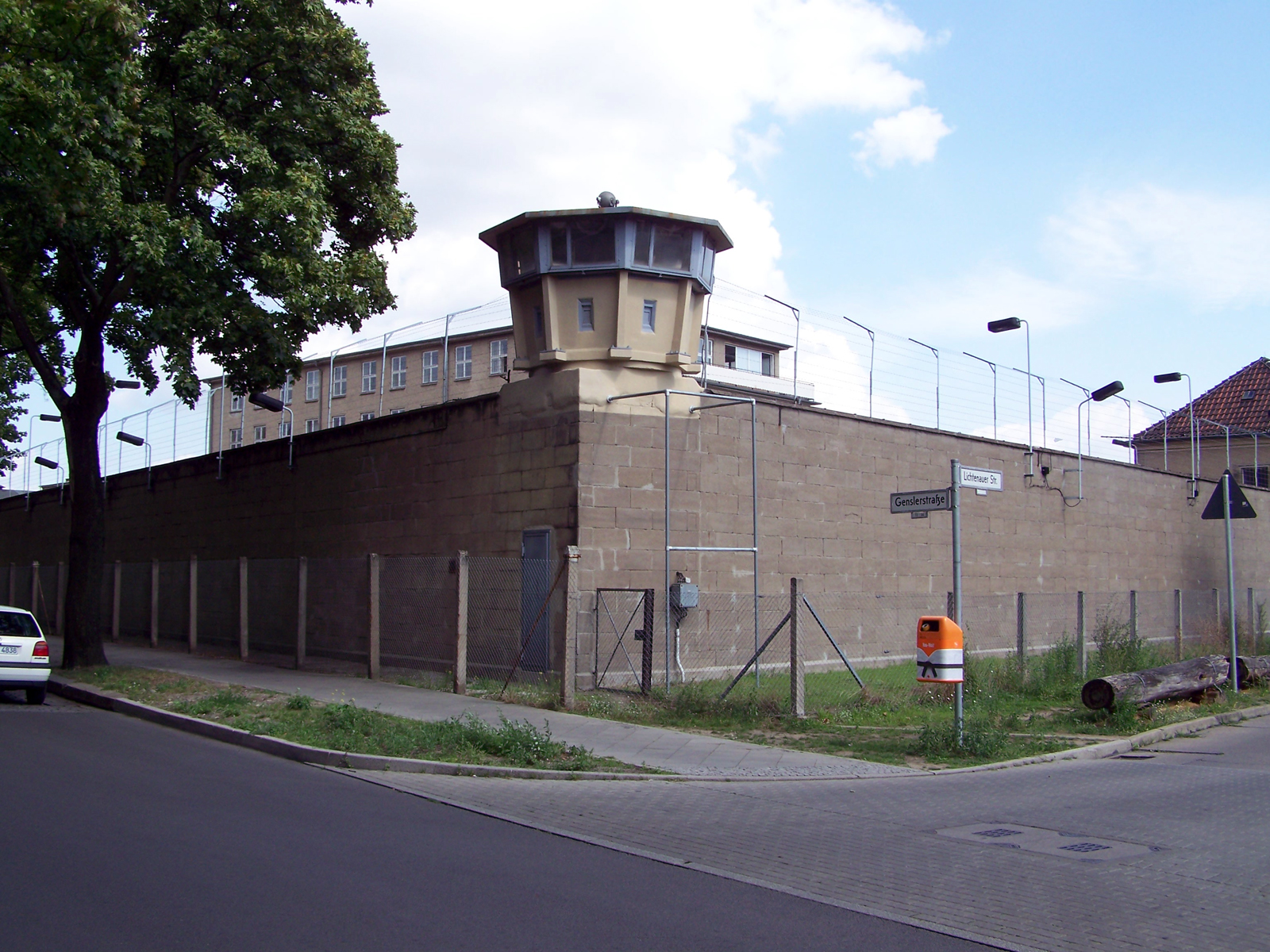
Berlin-Hohenschönhausen Memorial

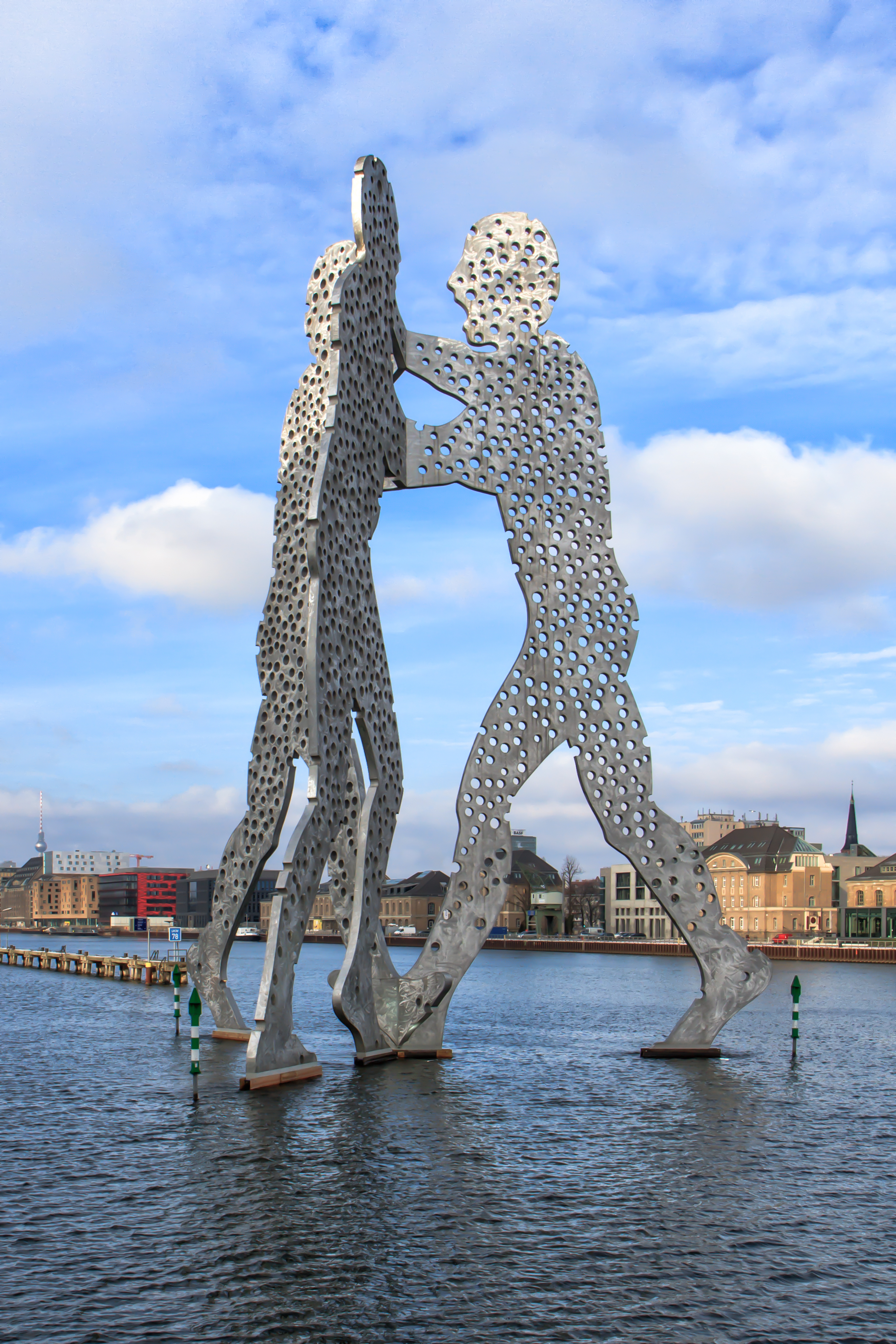
Molecule Man

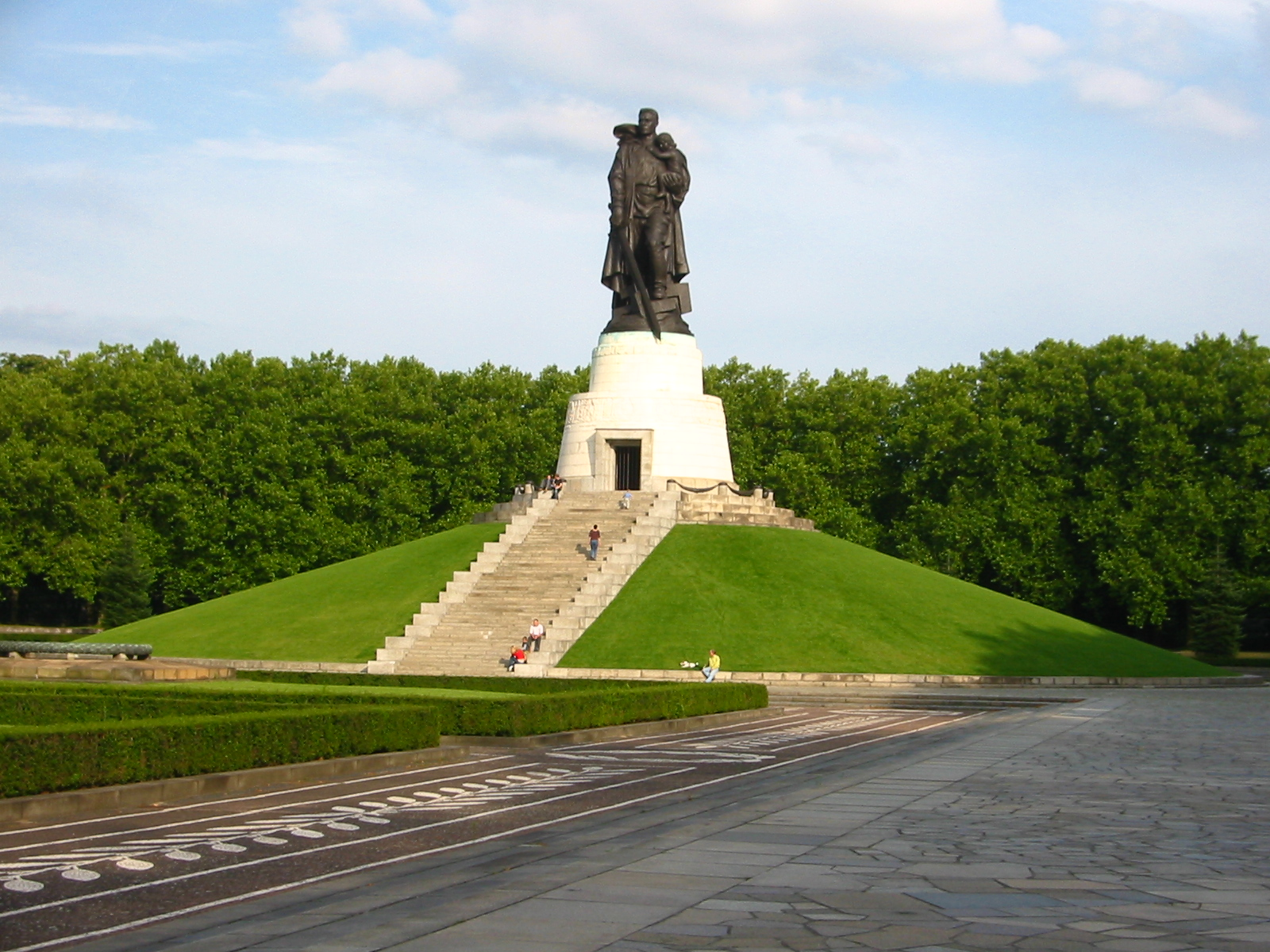
Soviet Cenotaph, Treptow

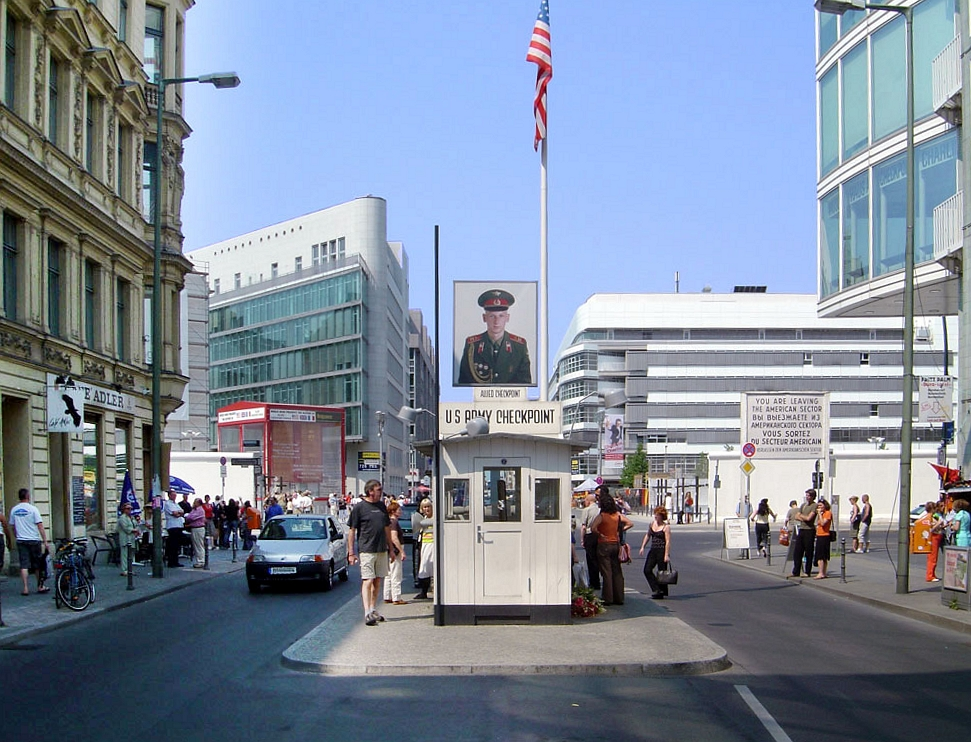
Checkpoint Charlie

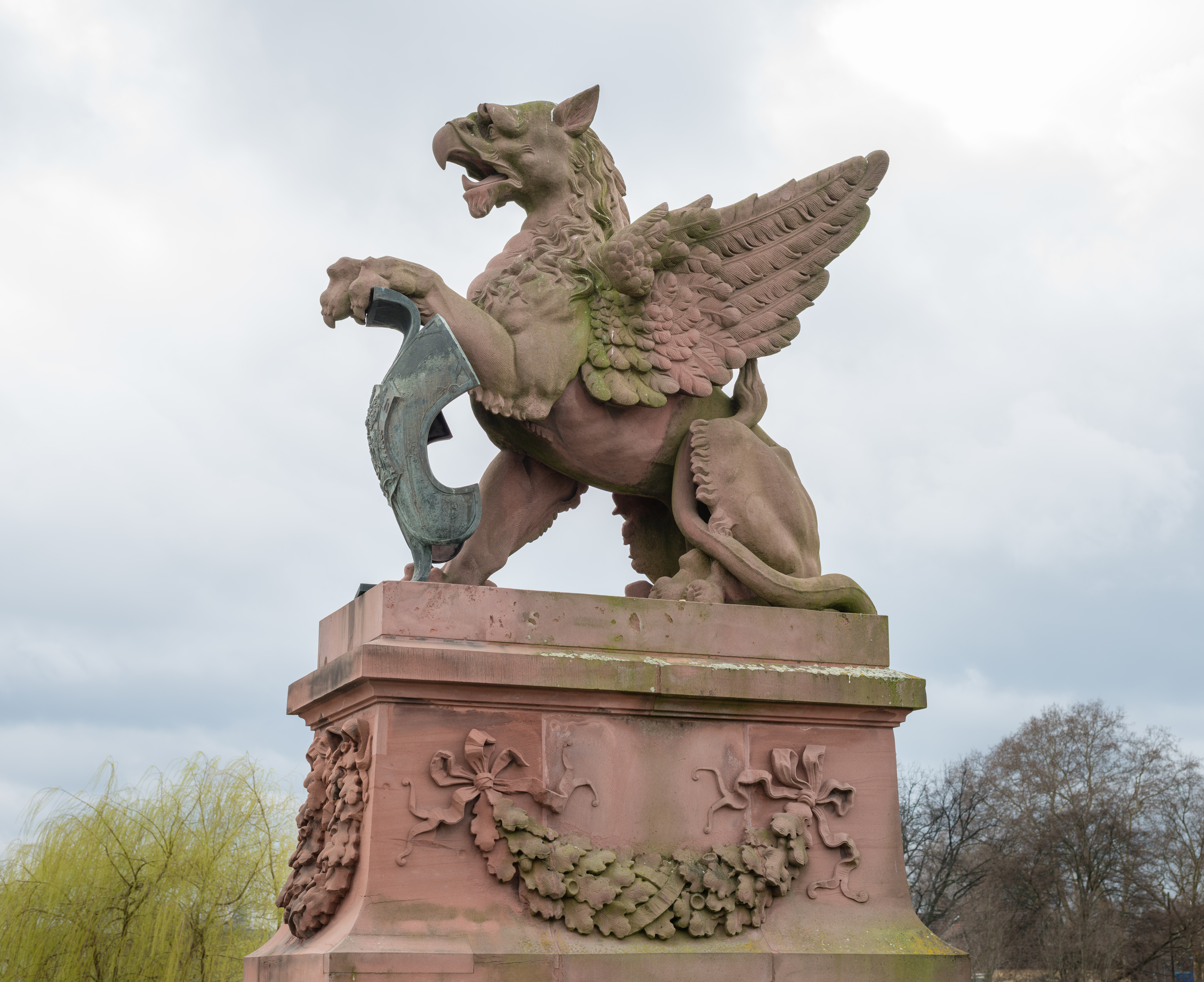
Dragon at Moltke Bridge

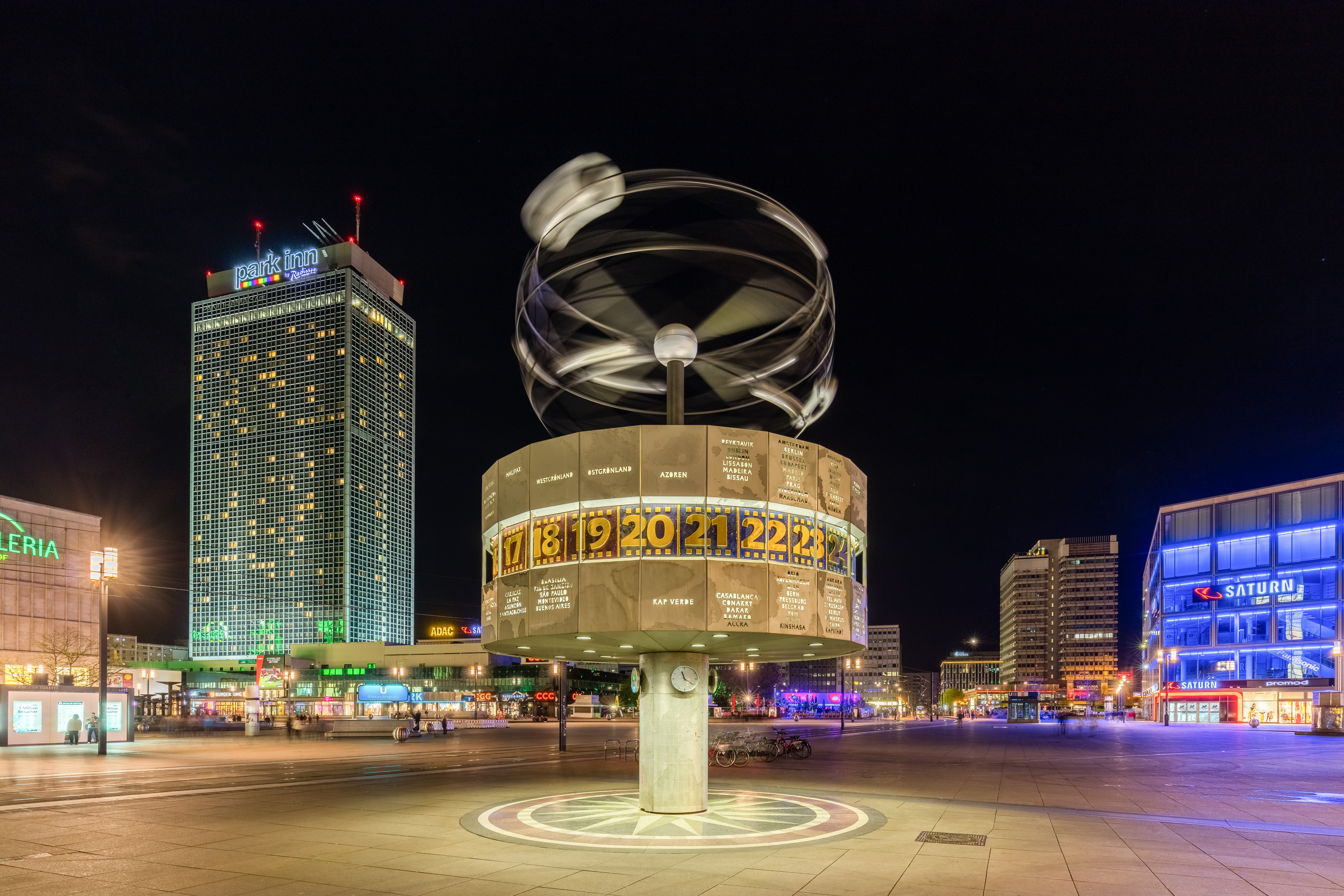
World Clock on Alexanderplatz

== Museums ==
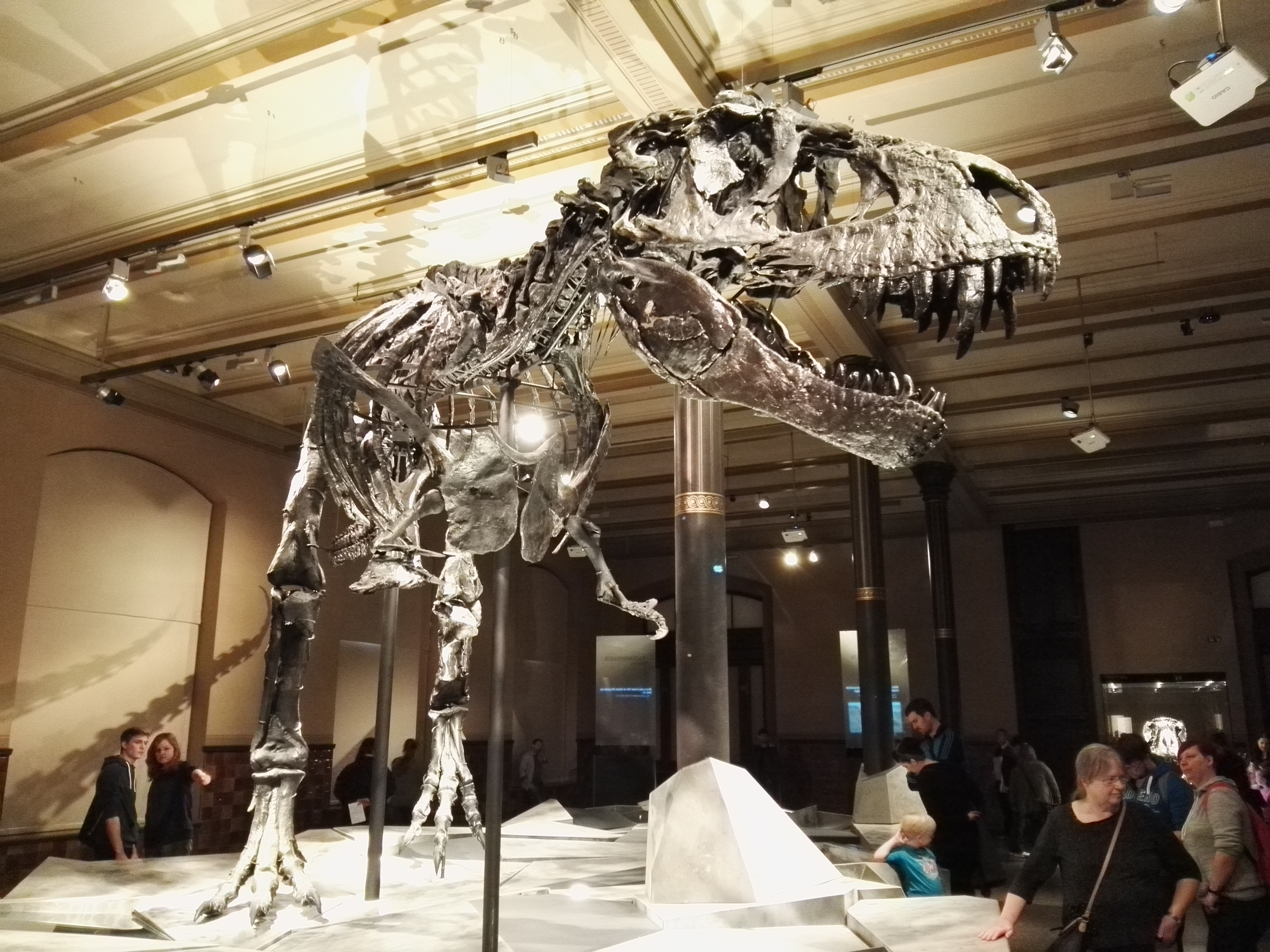
Museum of Natural History

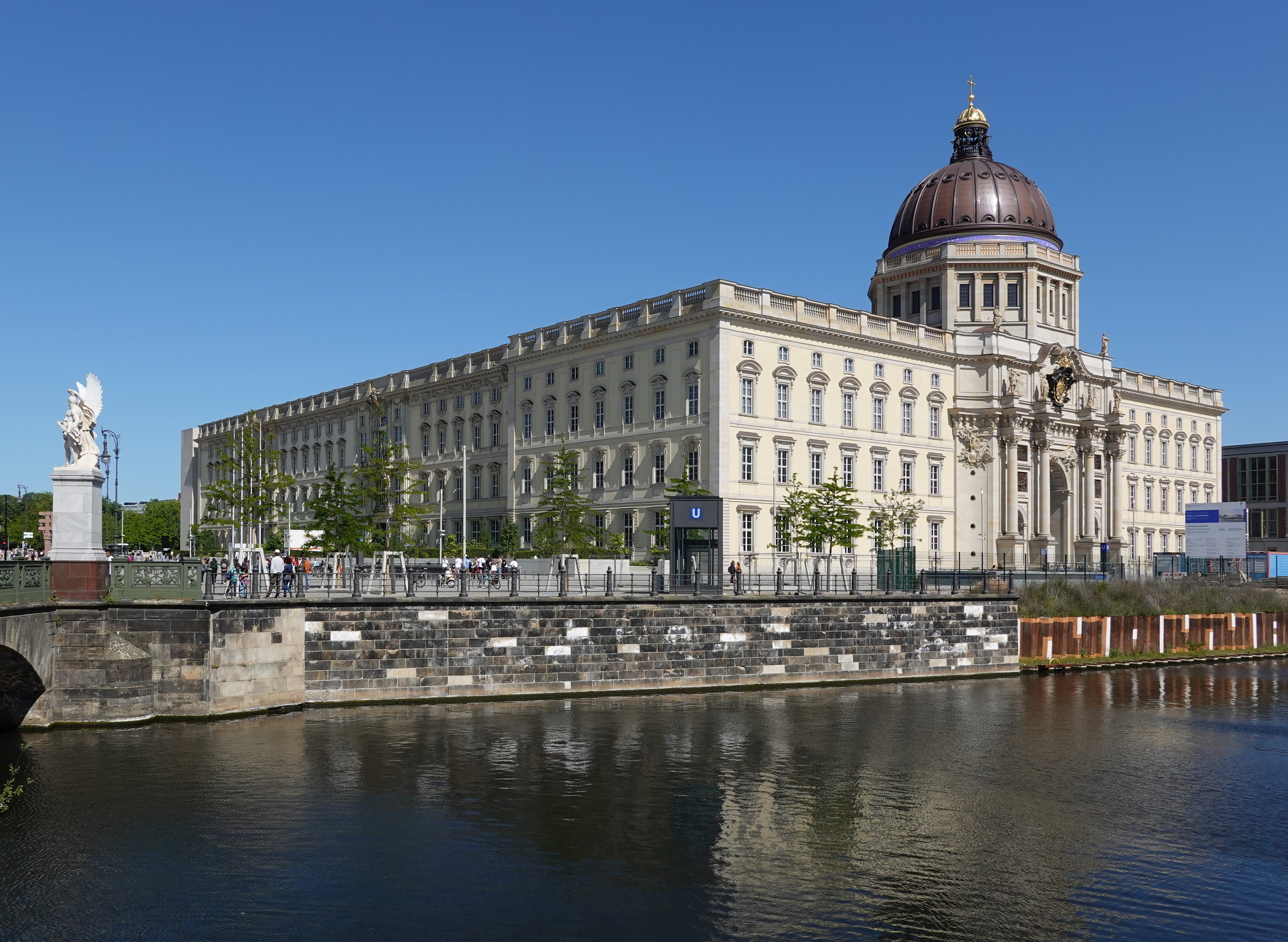
Berlin Palace / Humboldt Forum

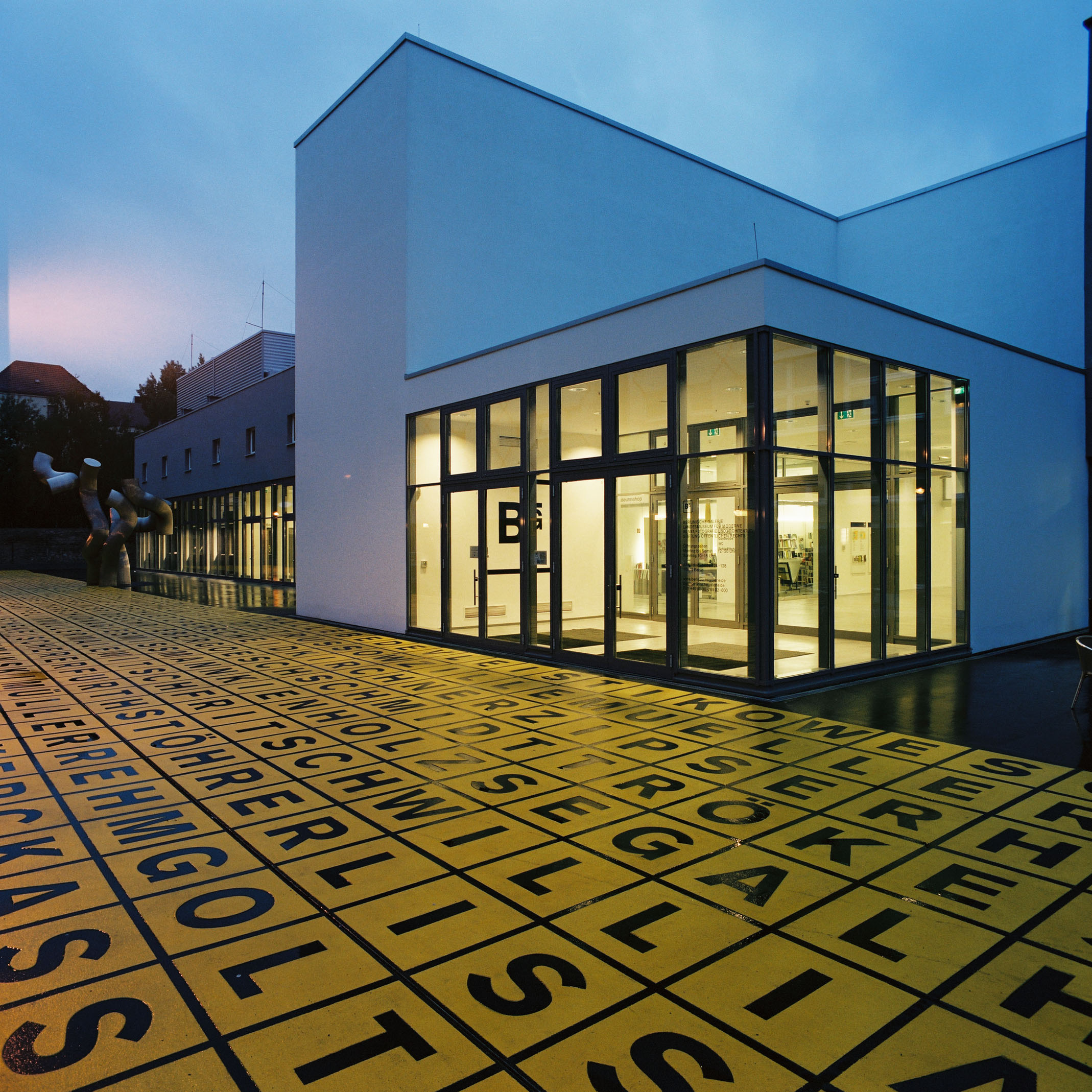
Berlinische Galerie

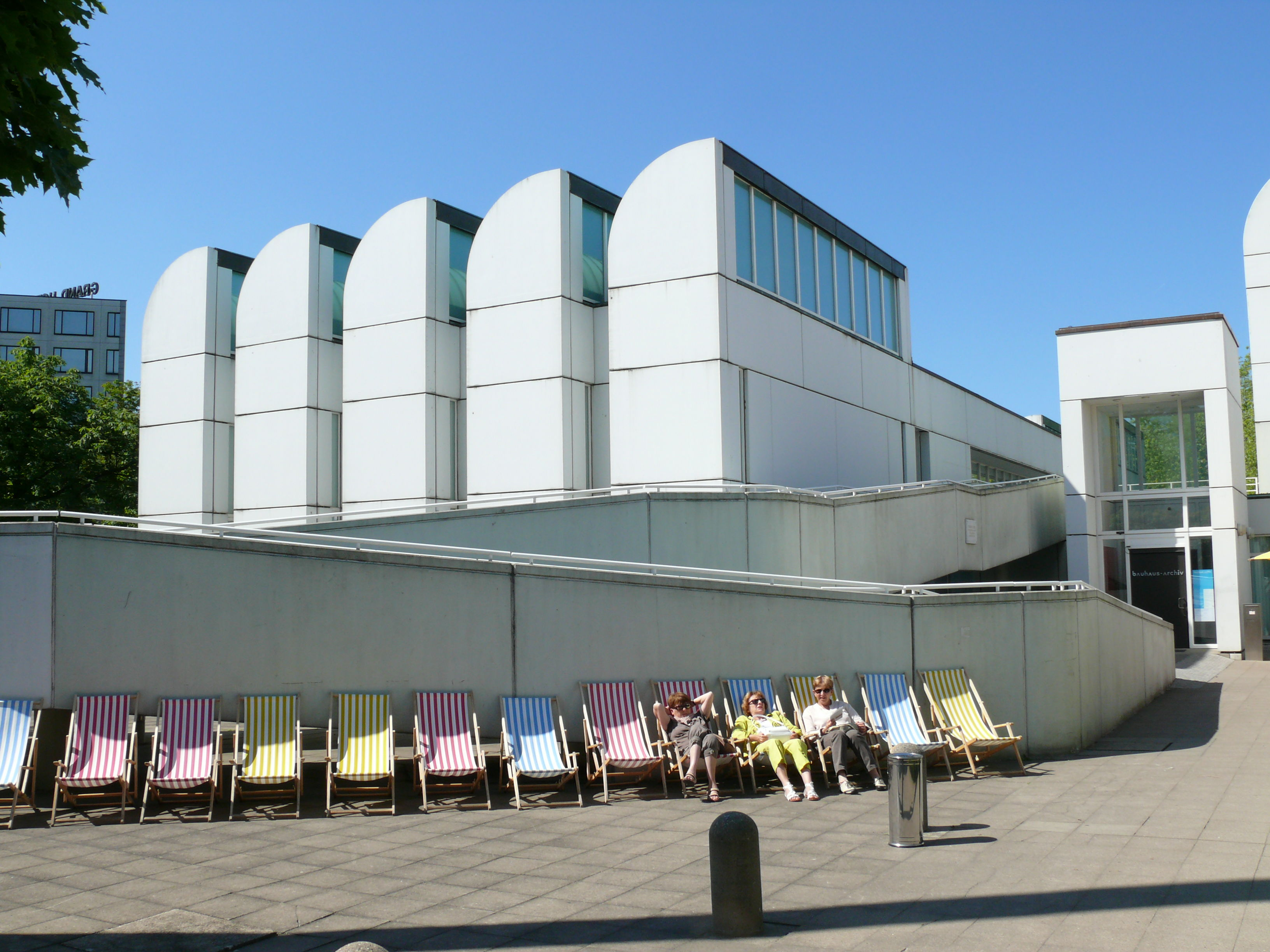
Bauhaus Archive

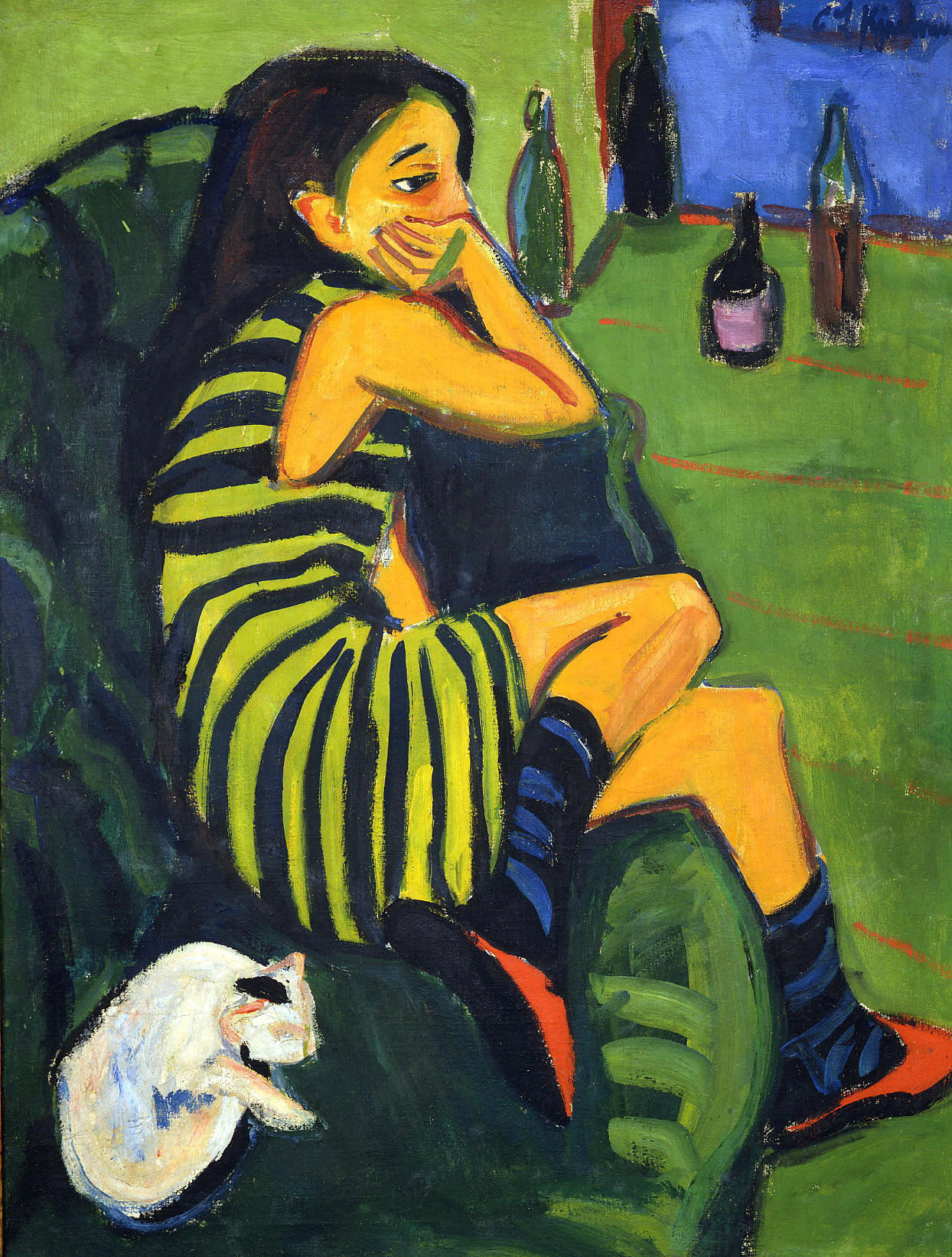
Brücke Museum

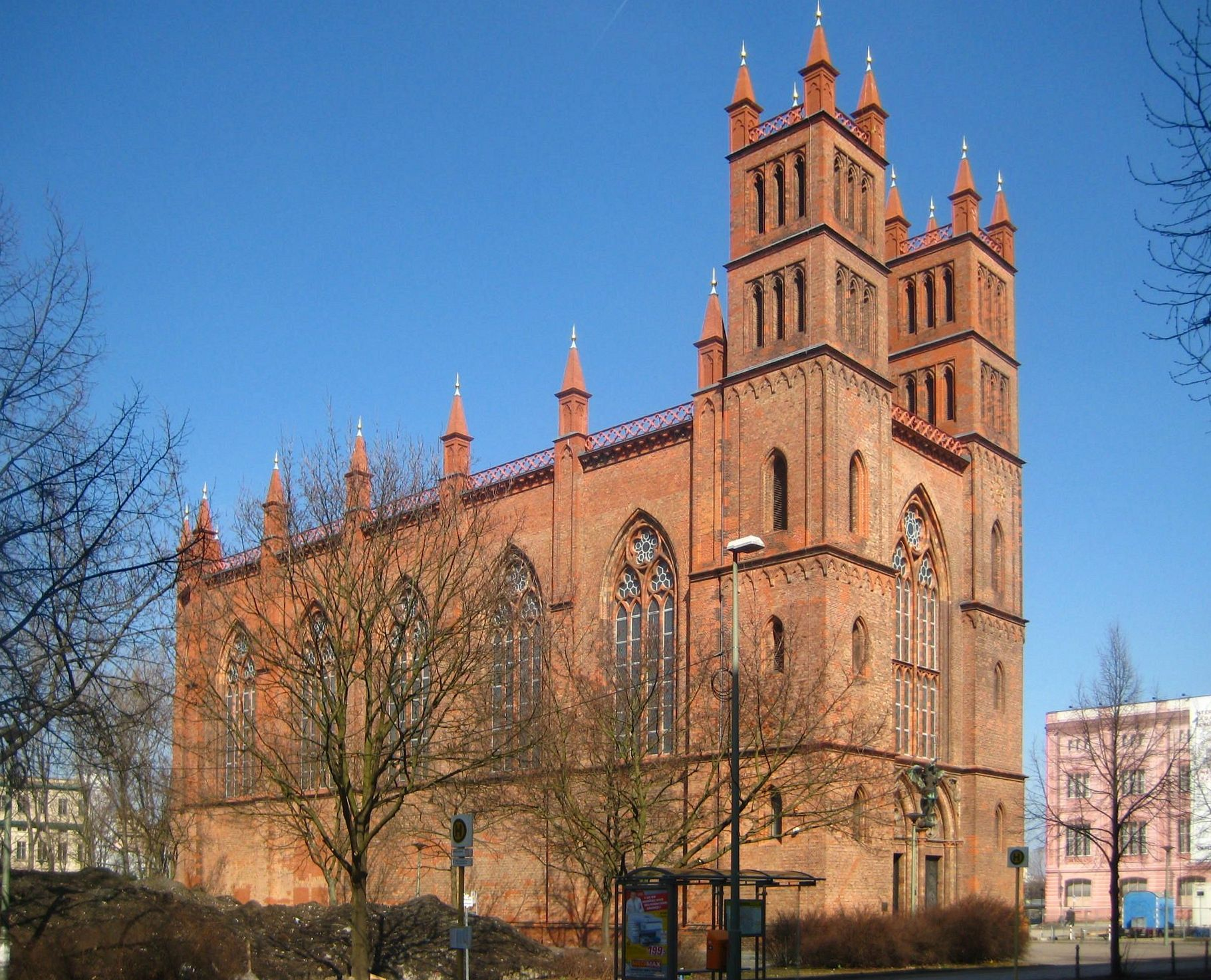
Friedrichswerder Church

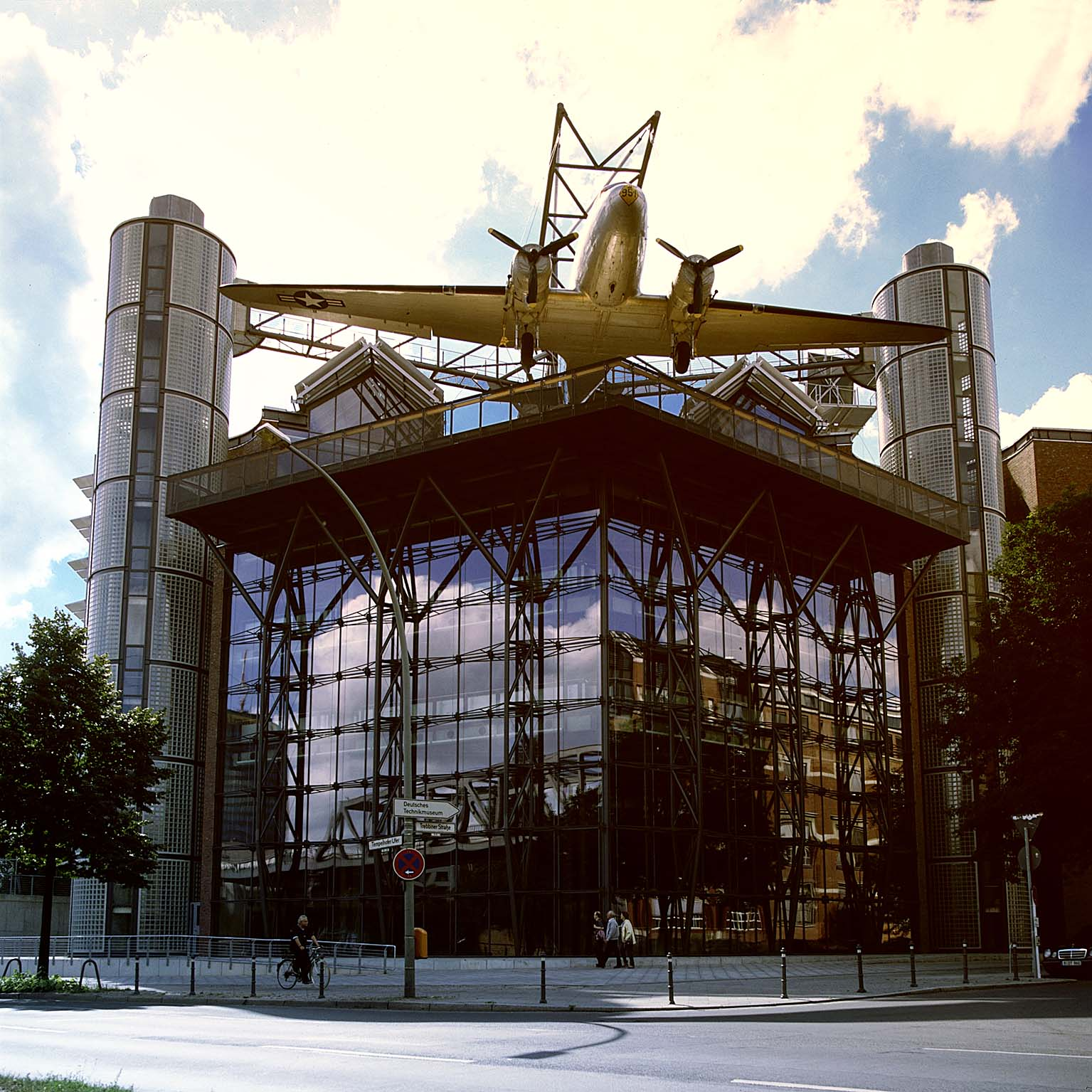
German Museum of Technology

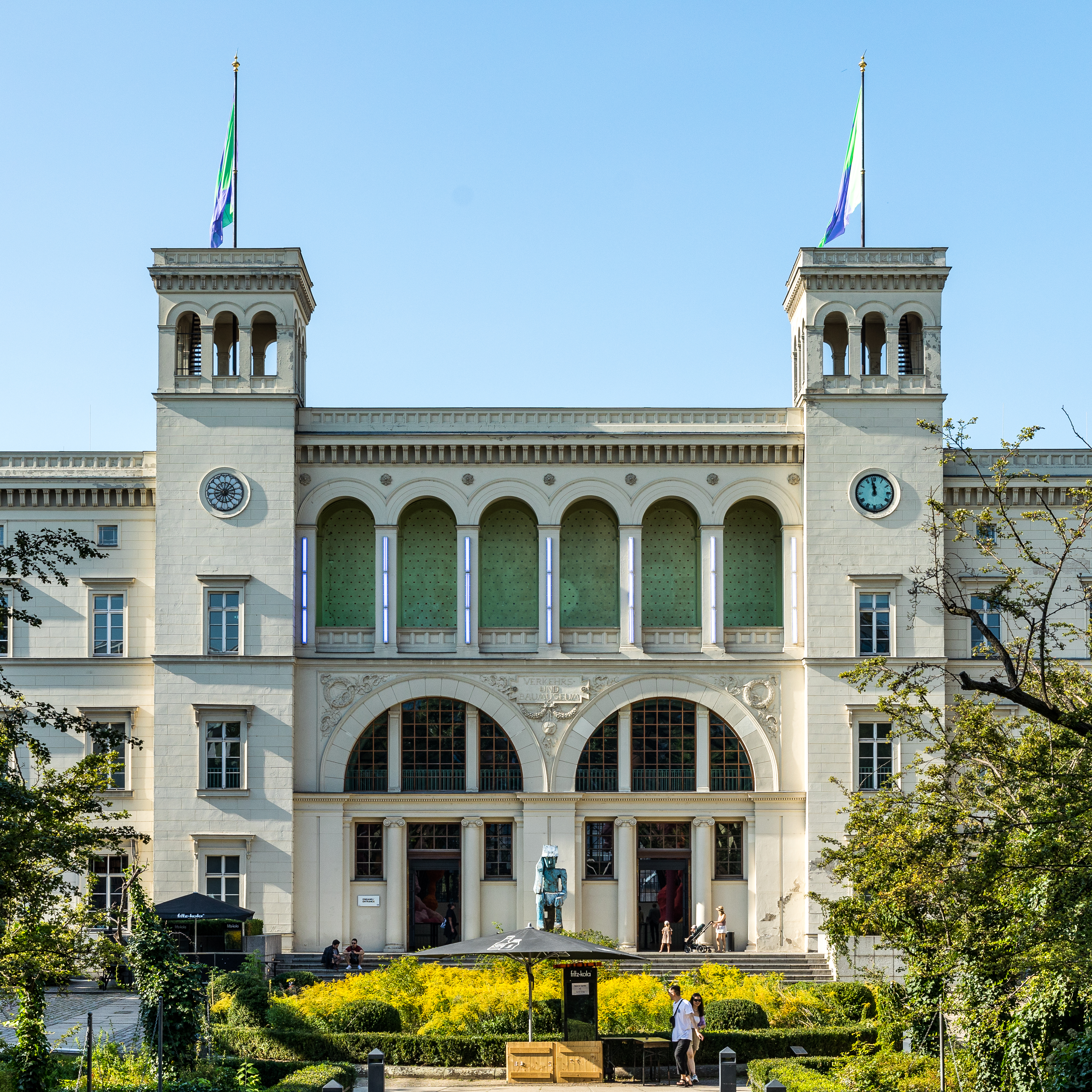
Hamburger Bahnhof

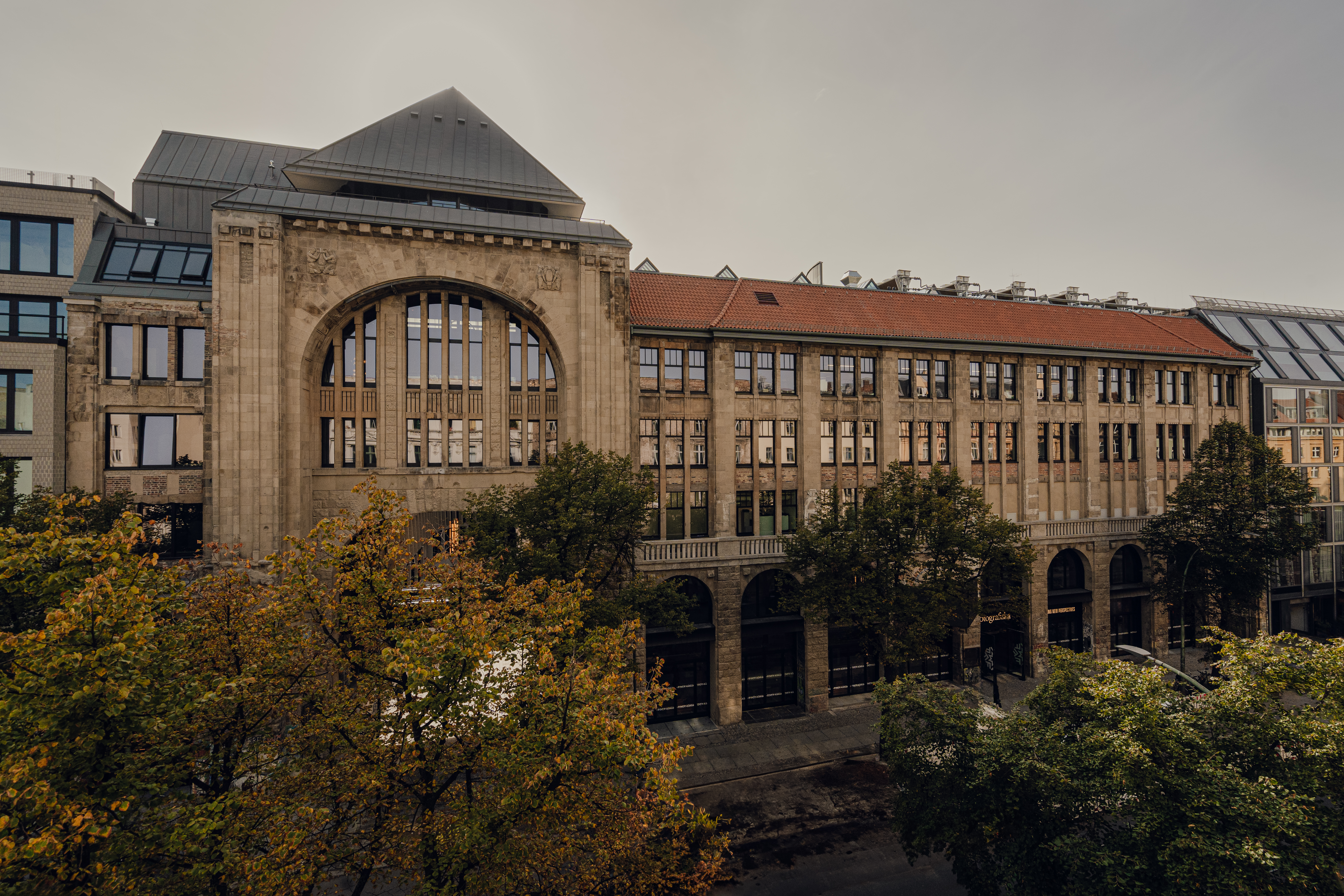
Fotografiska Berlin

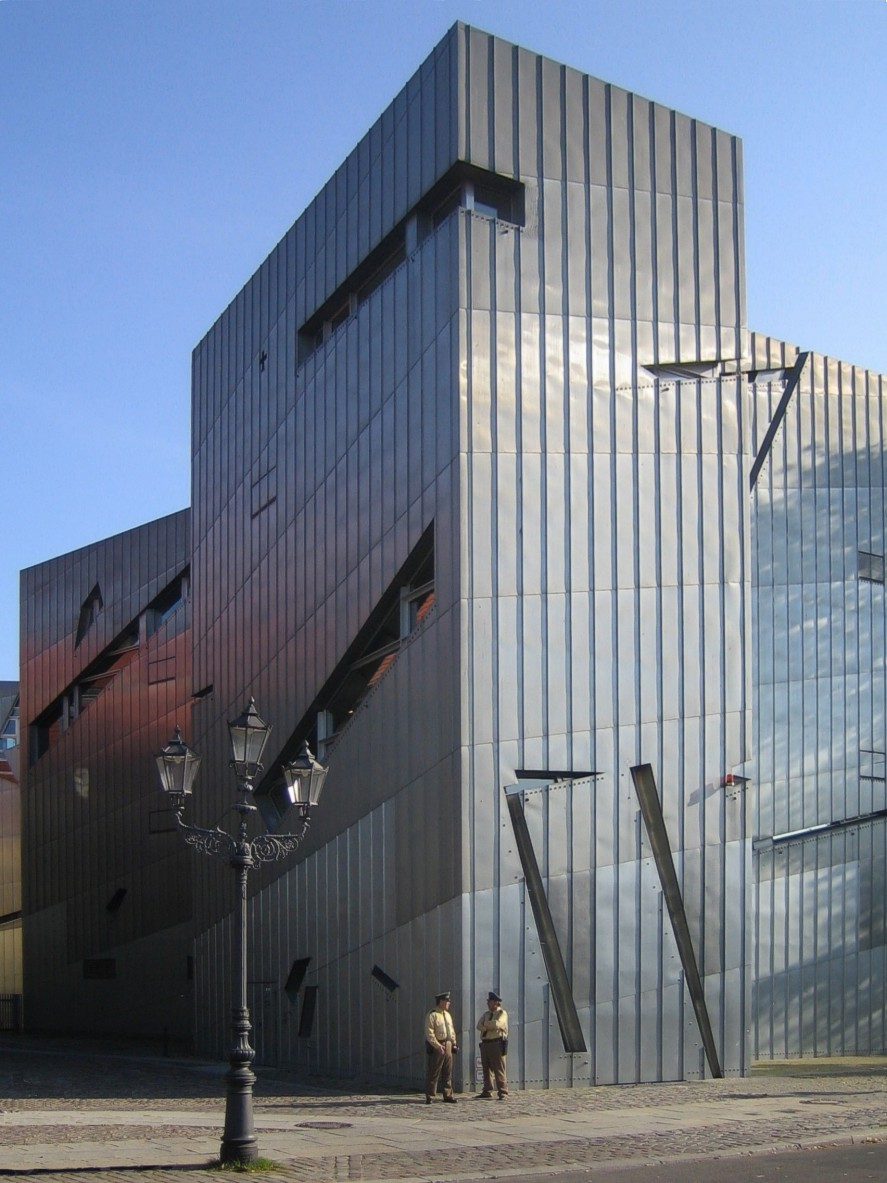
Jewish Museum

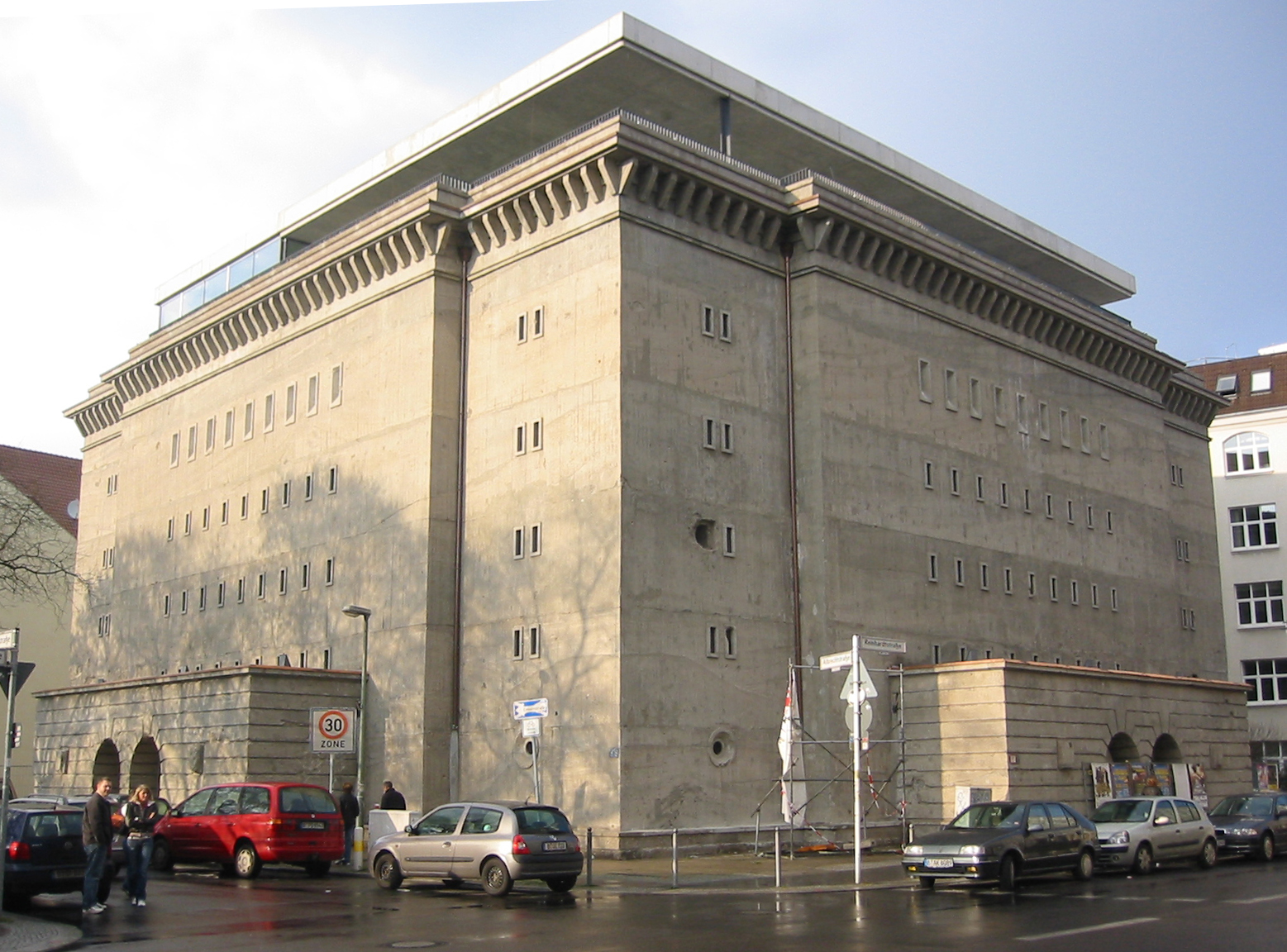
Boros Art Collection

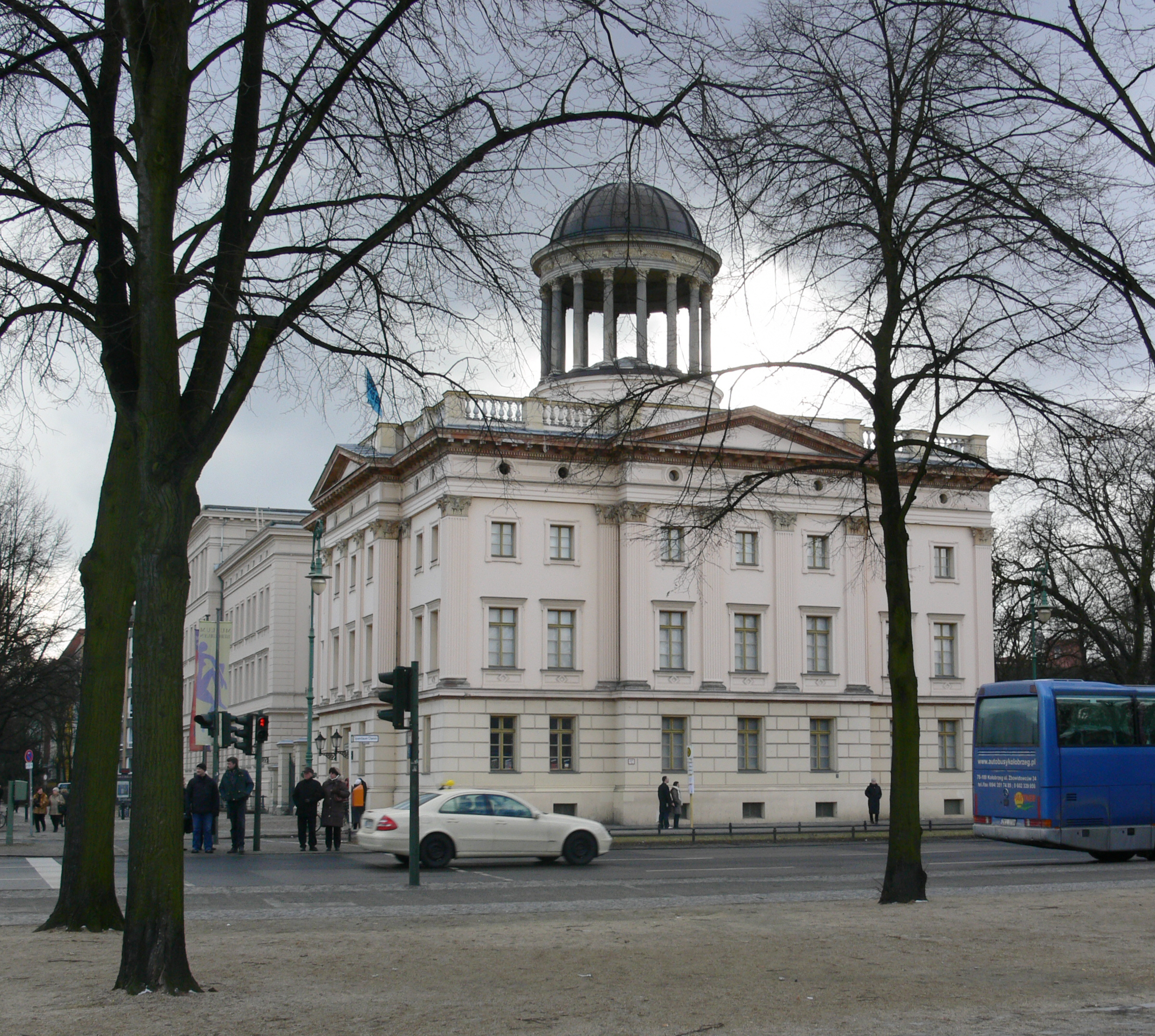
Berggruen Museum

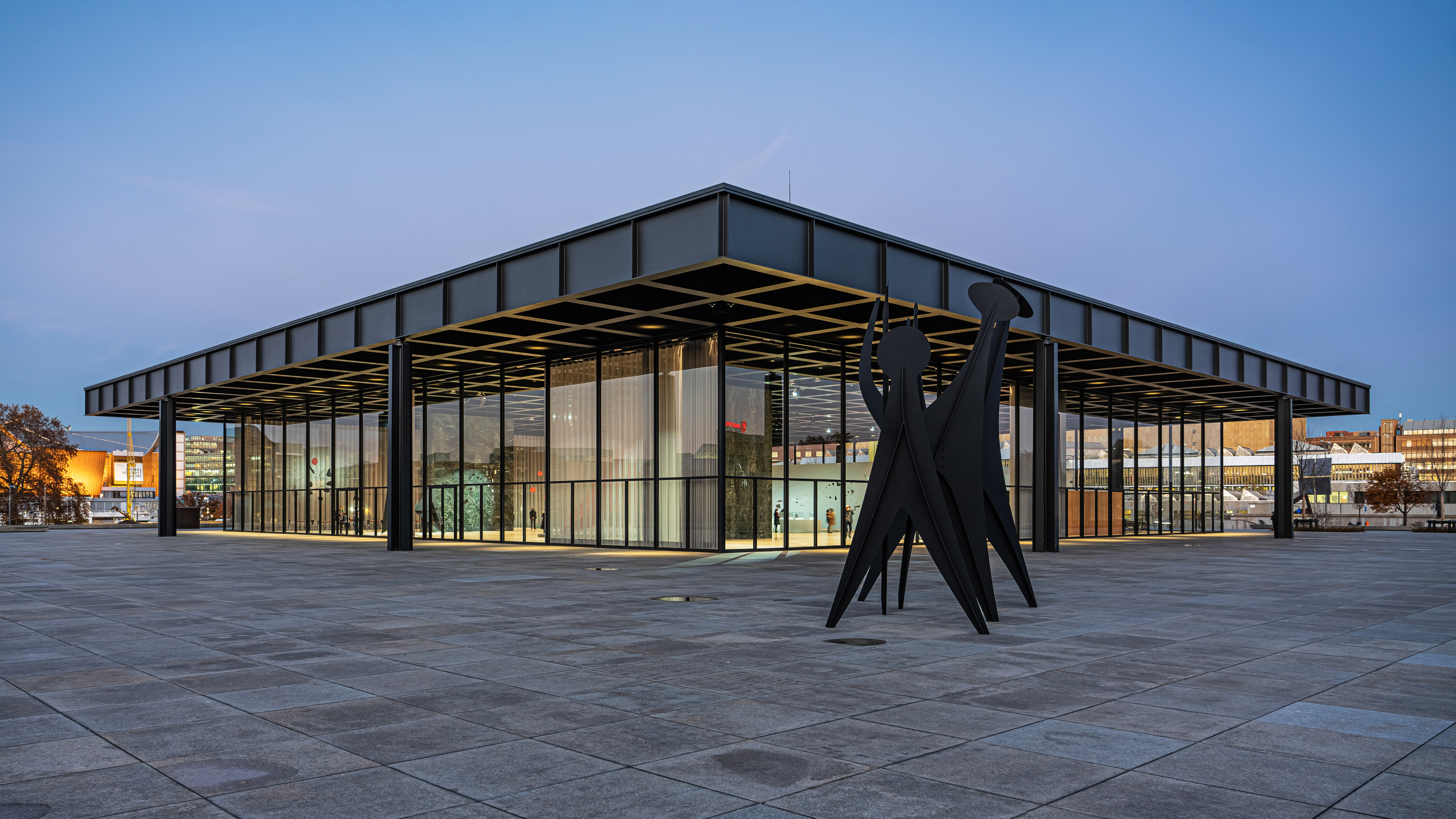
Neue Nationalgalerie

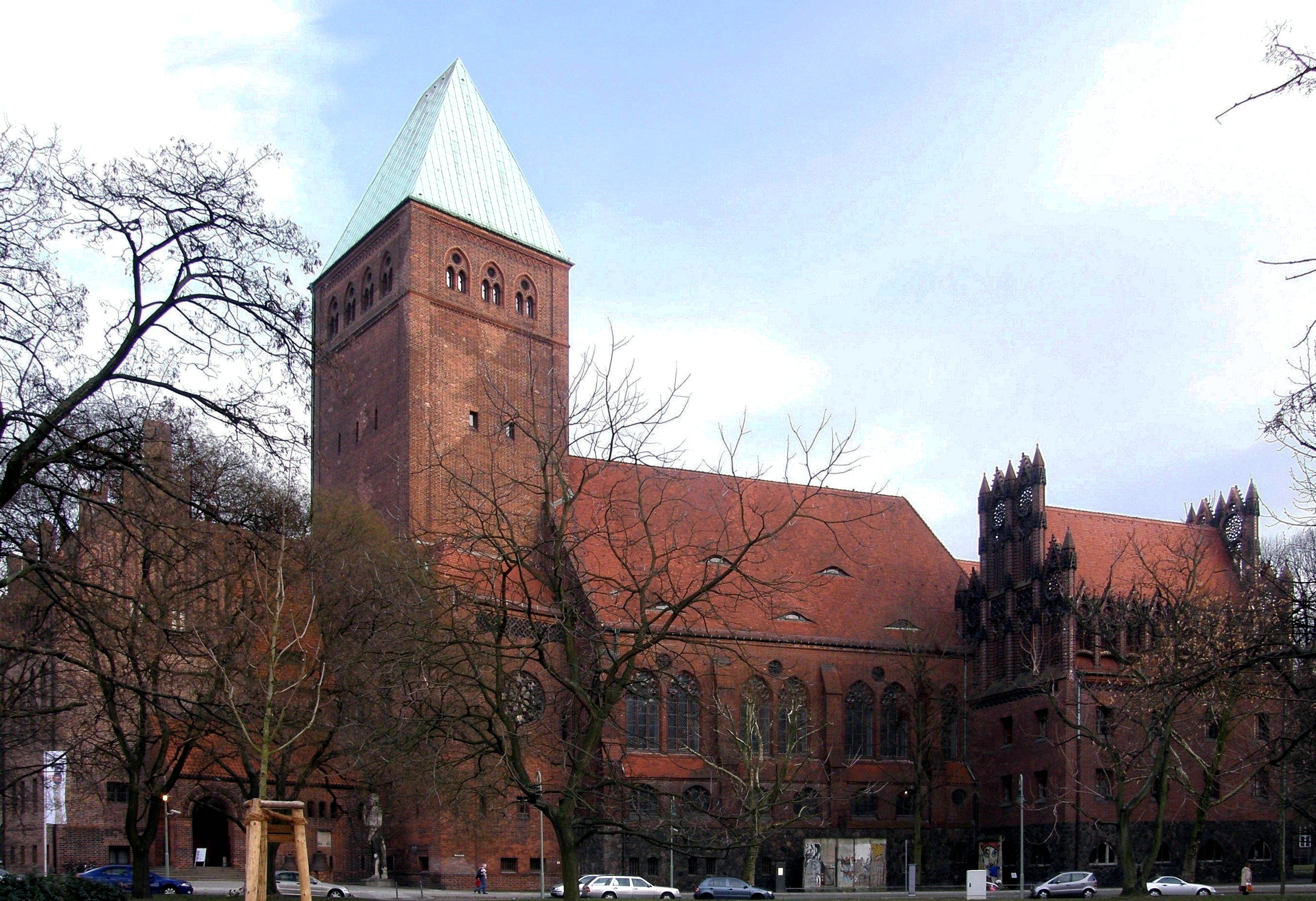
Märkisches Museum

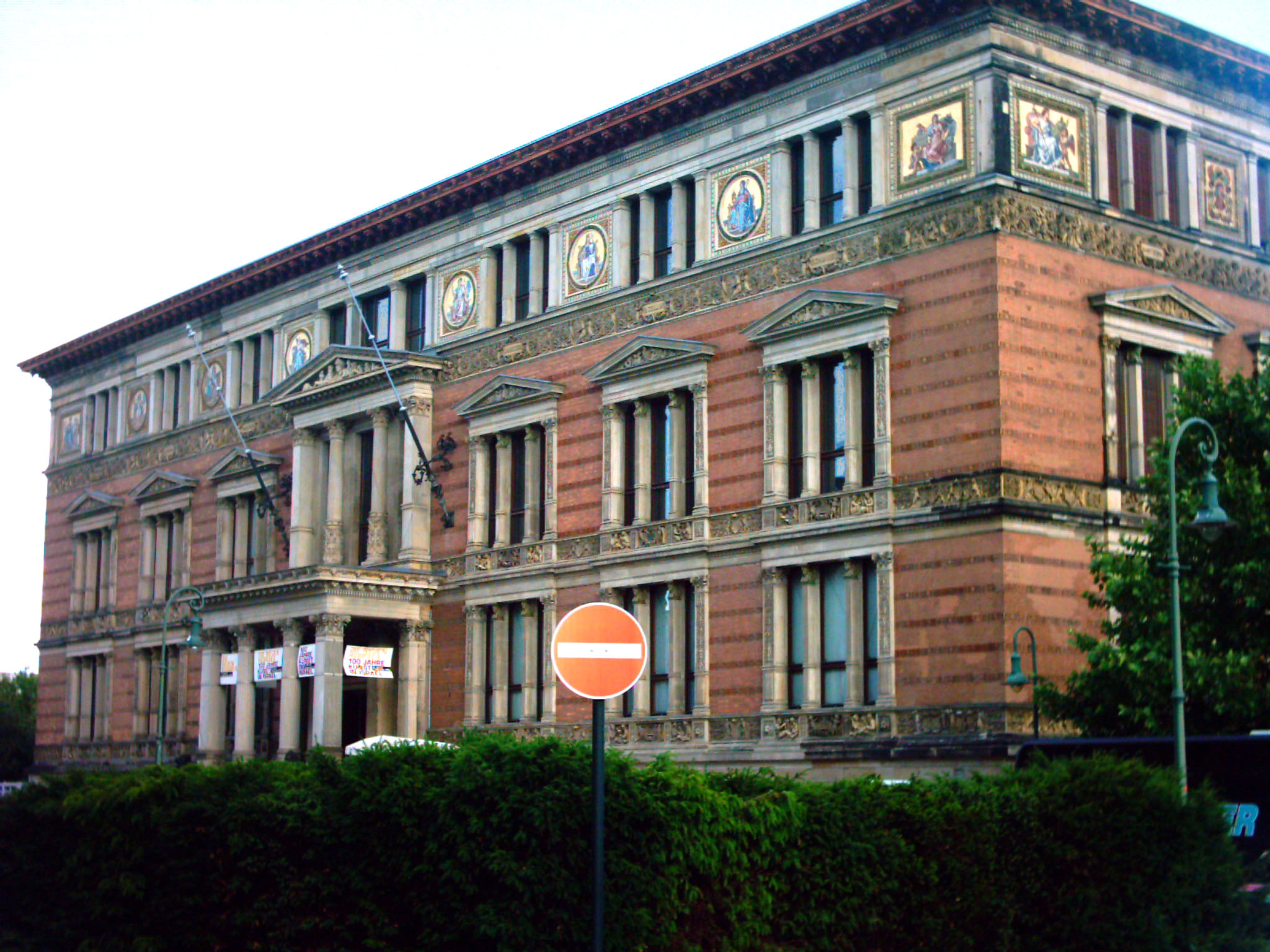
Martin-Gropius-Bau

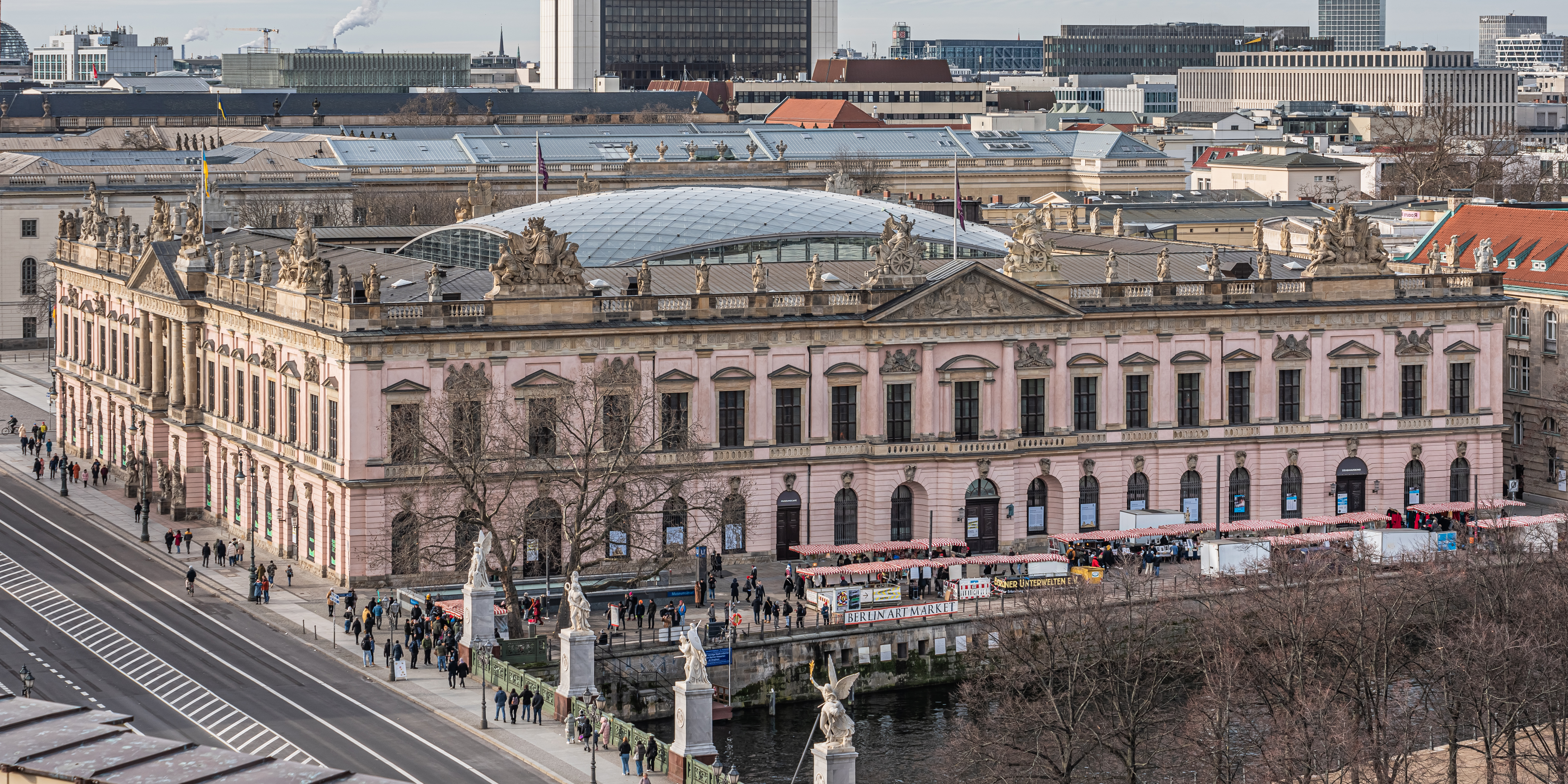
Deutsches Historisches Museum

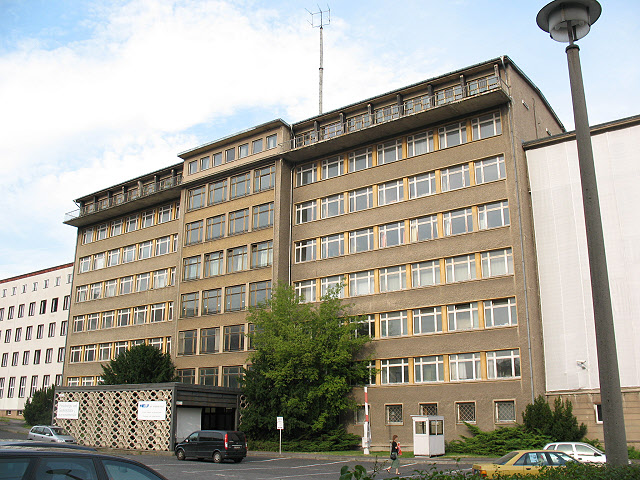
Stasi Museum

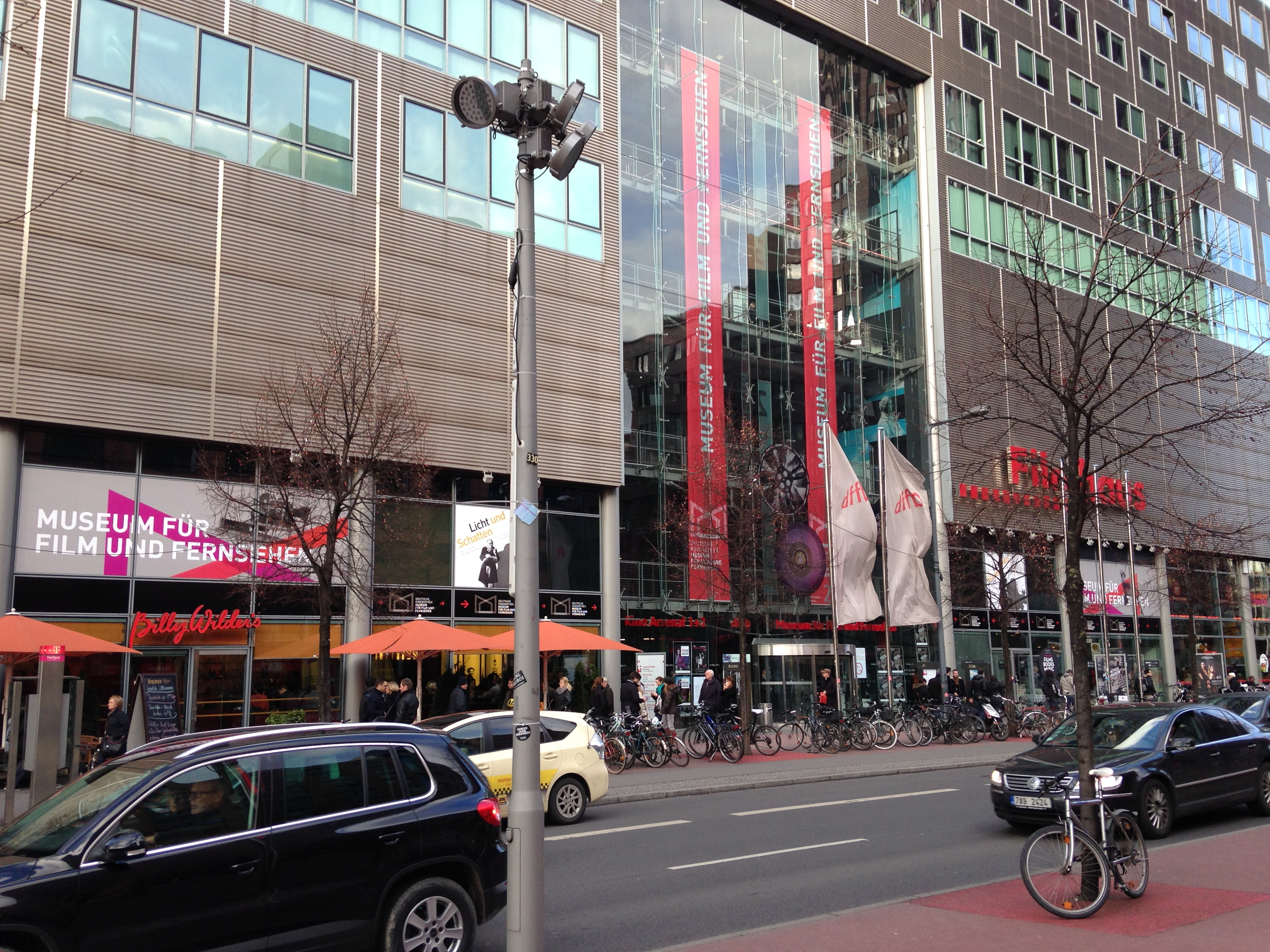
Museum of Film and Television Berlin

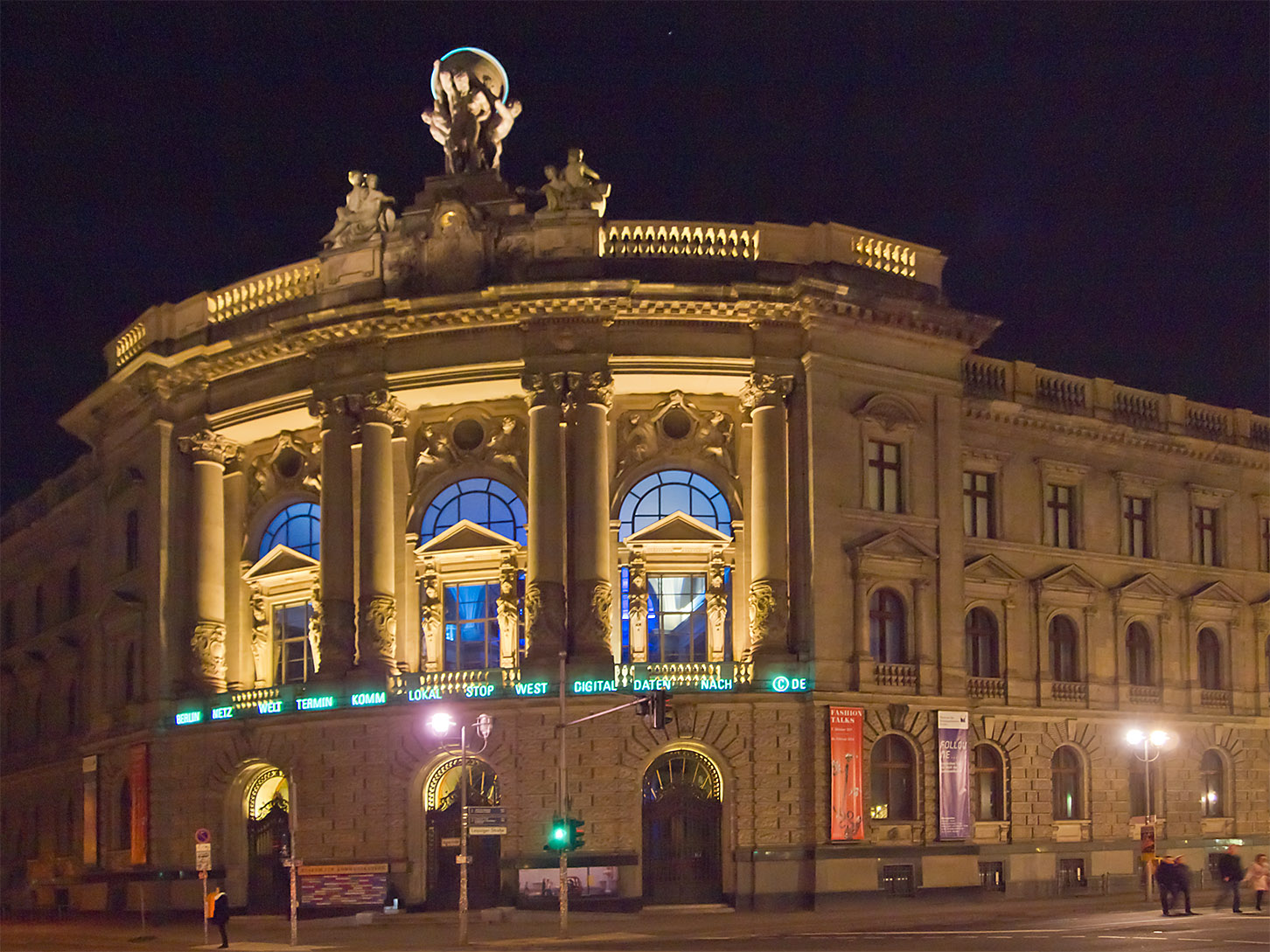
Museum für Kommunikation

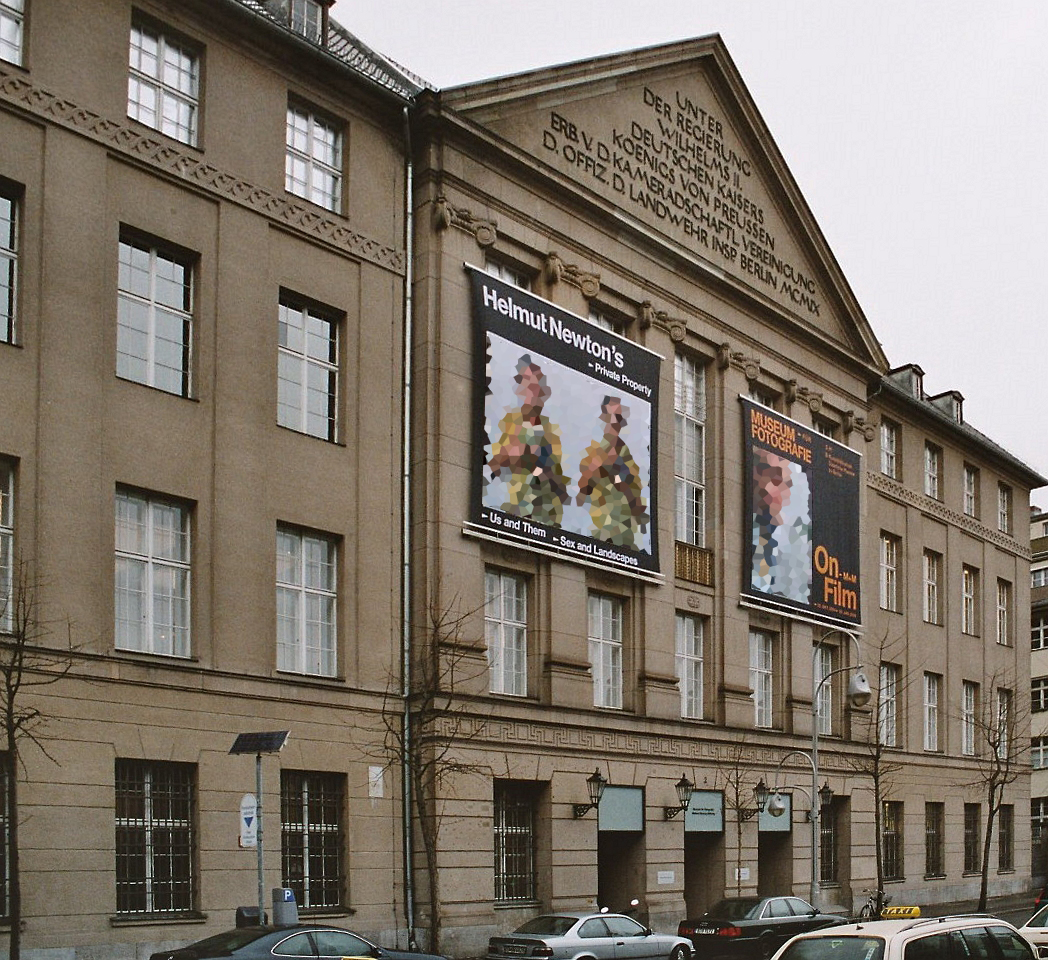
Museum of Photography

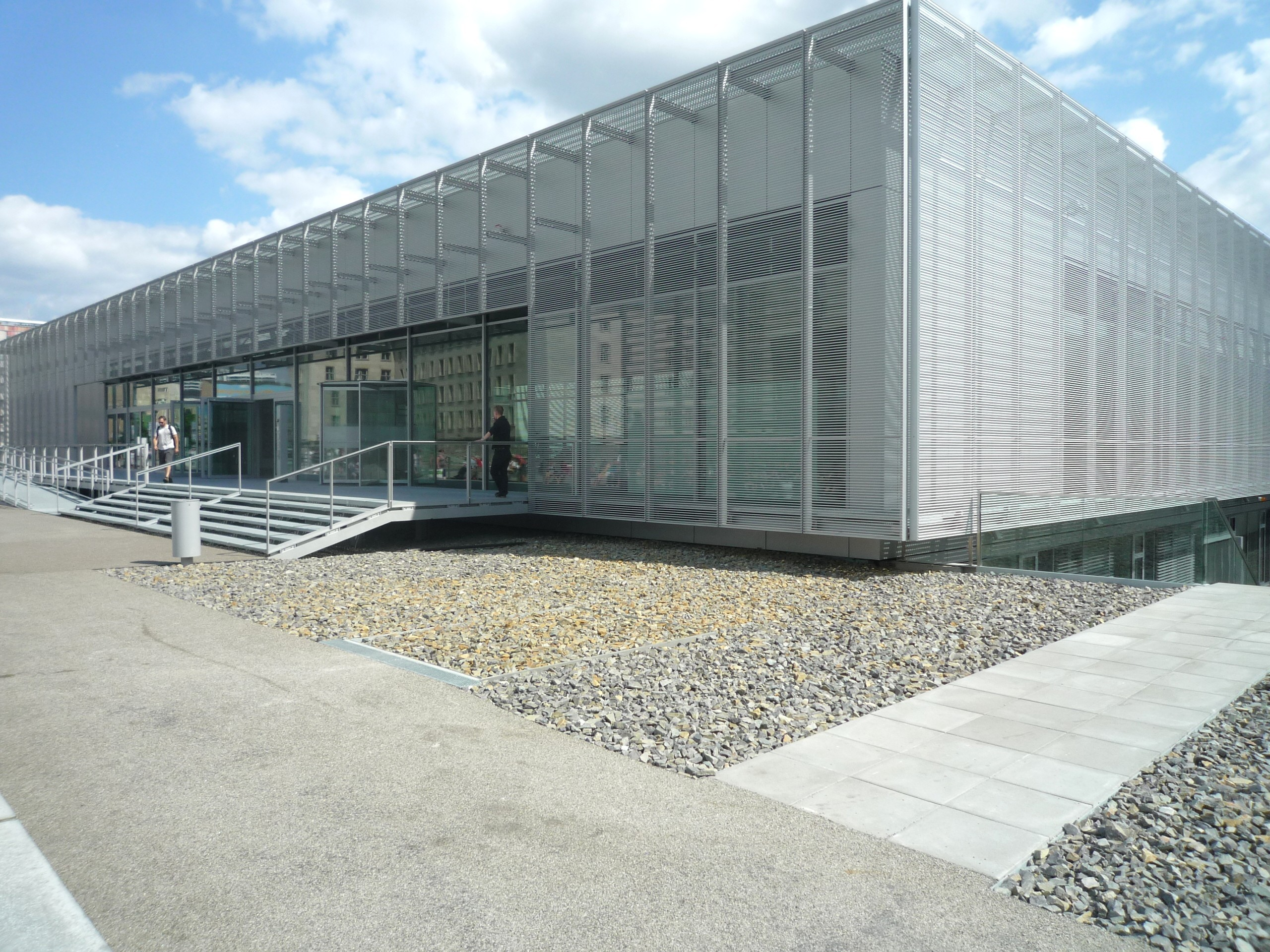
Topography of Terror

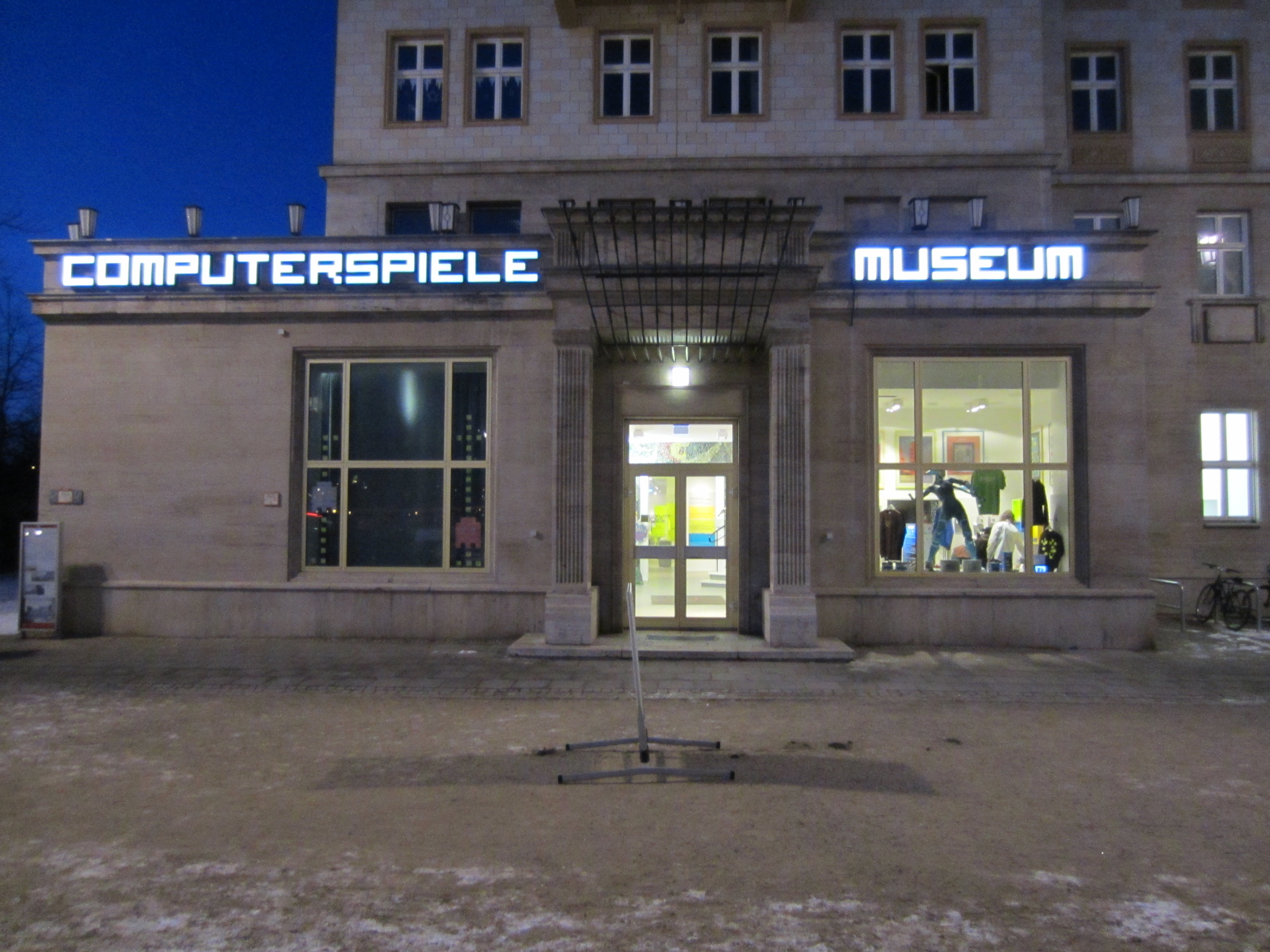
Computerspielemuseum Berlin

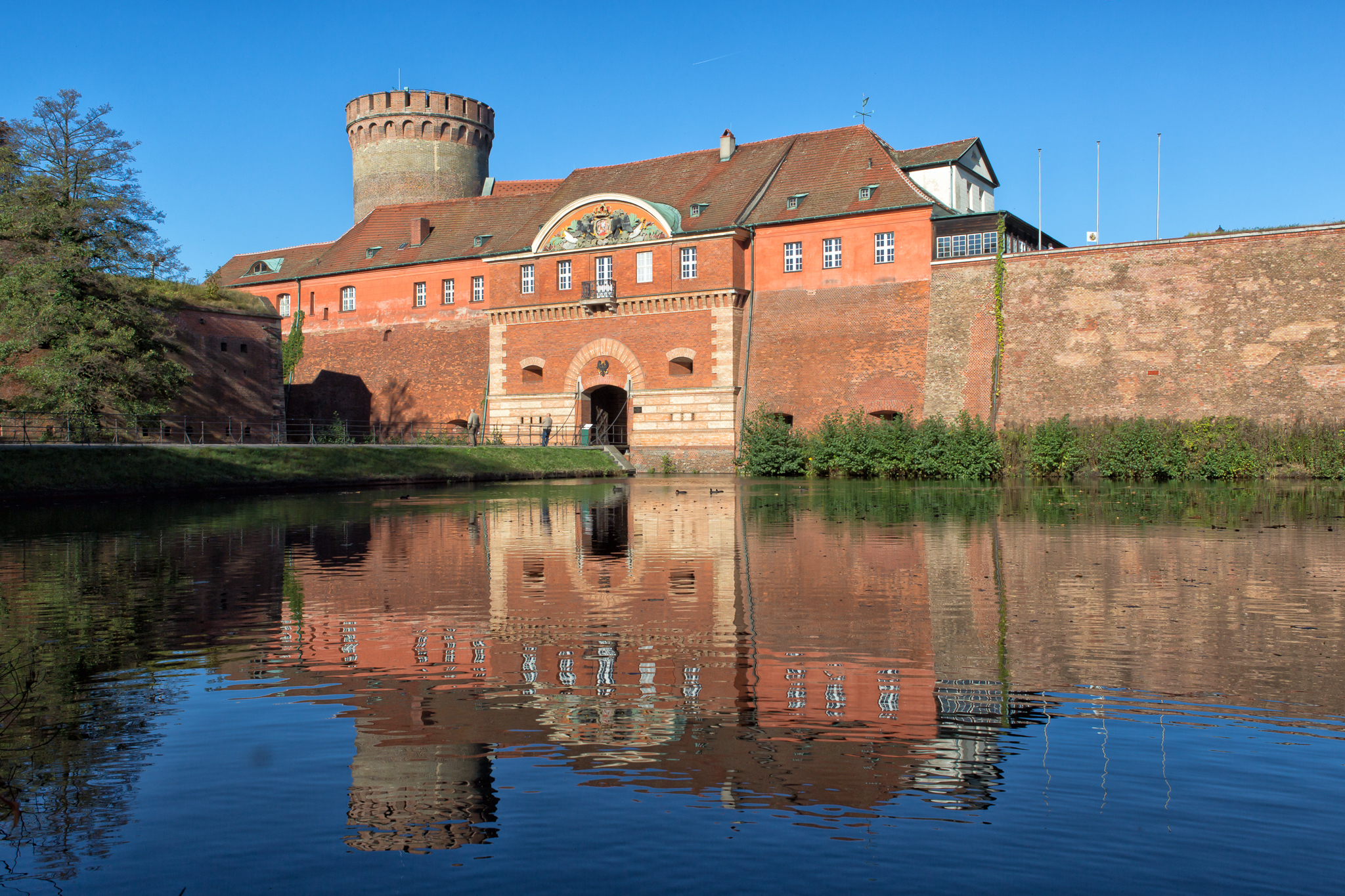
Spandau Citadel

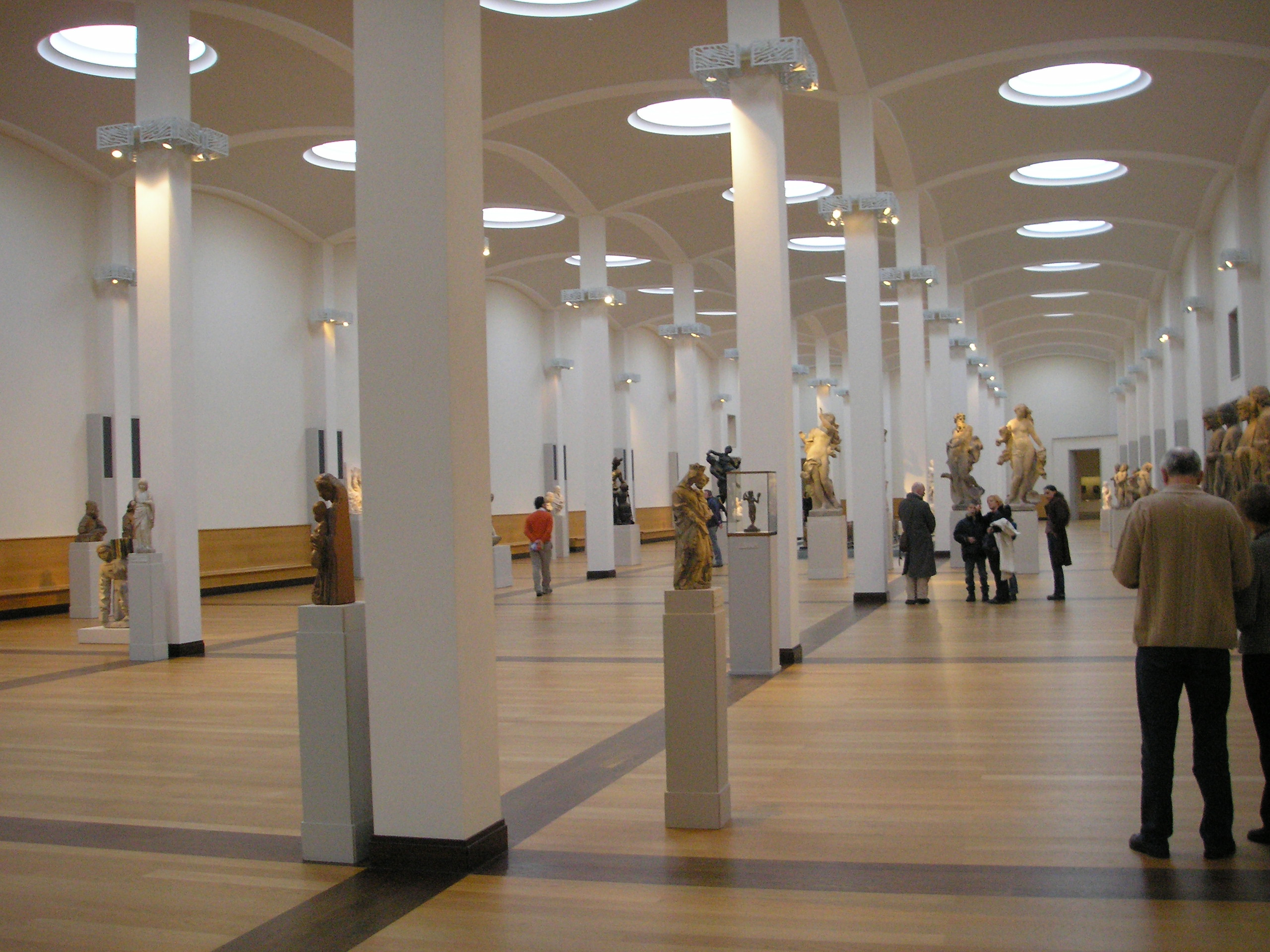
Gemäldegalerie, Berlin at Kulturforum

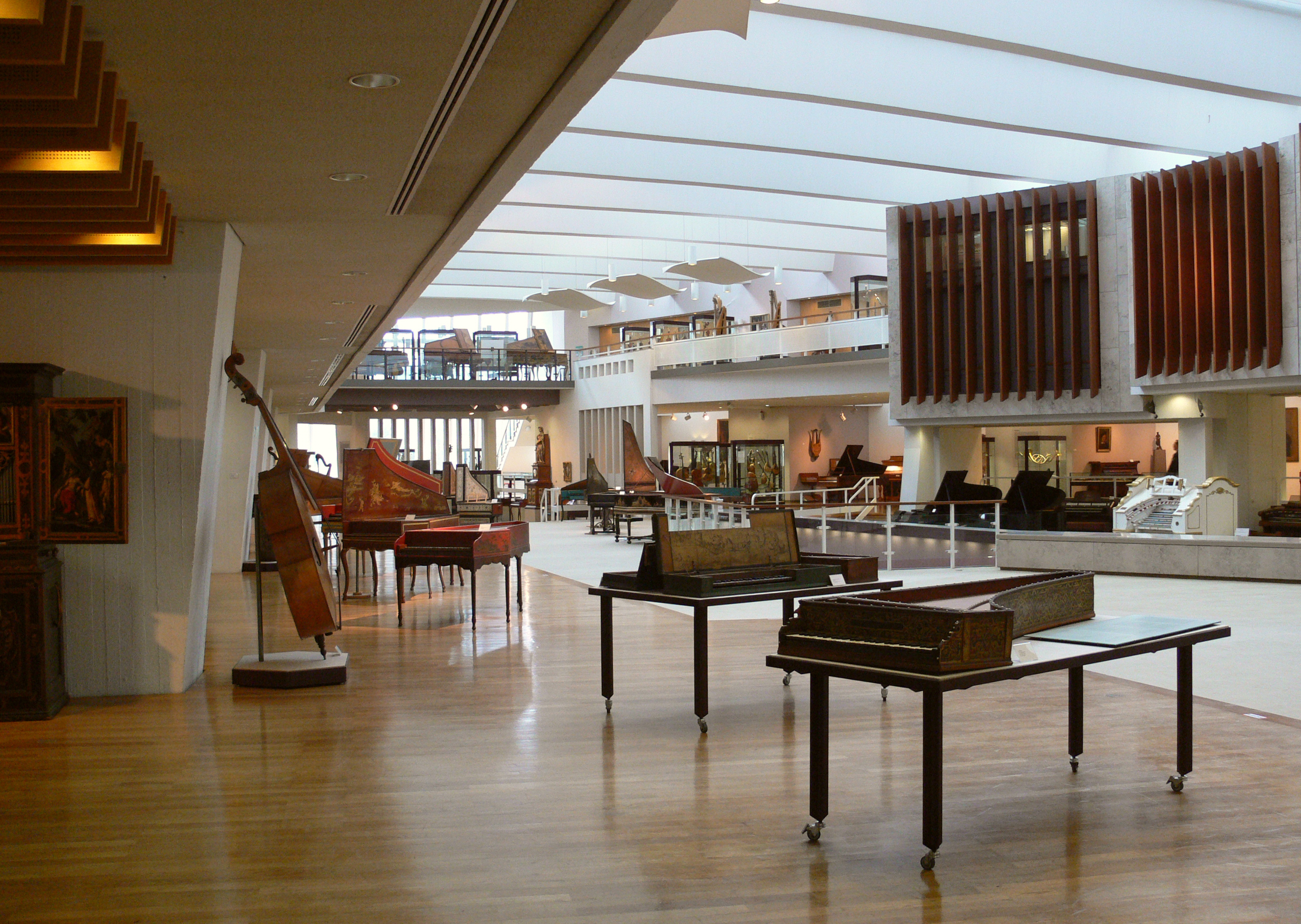
Musical Instrument Museum

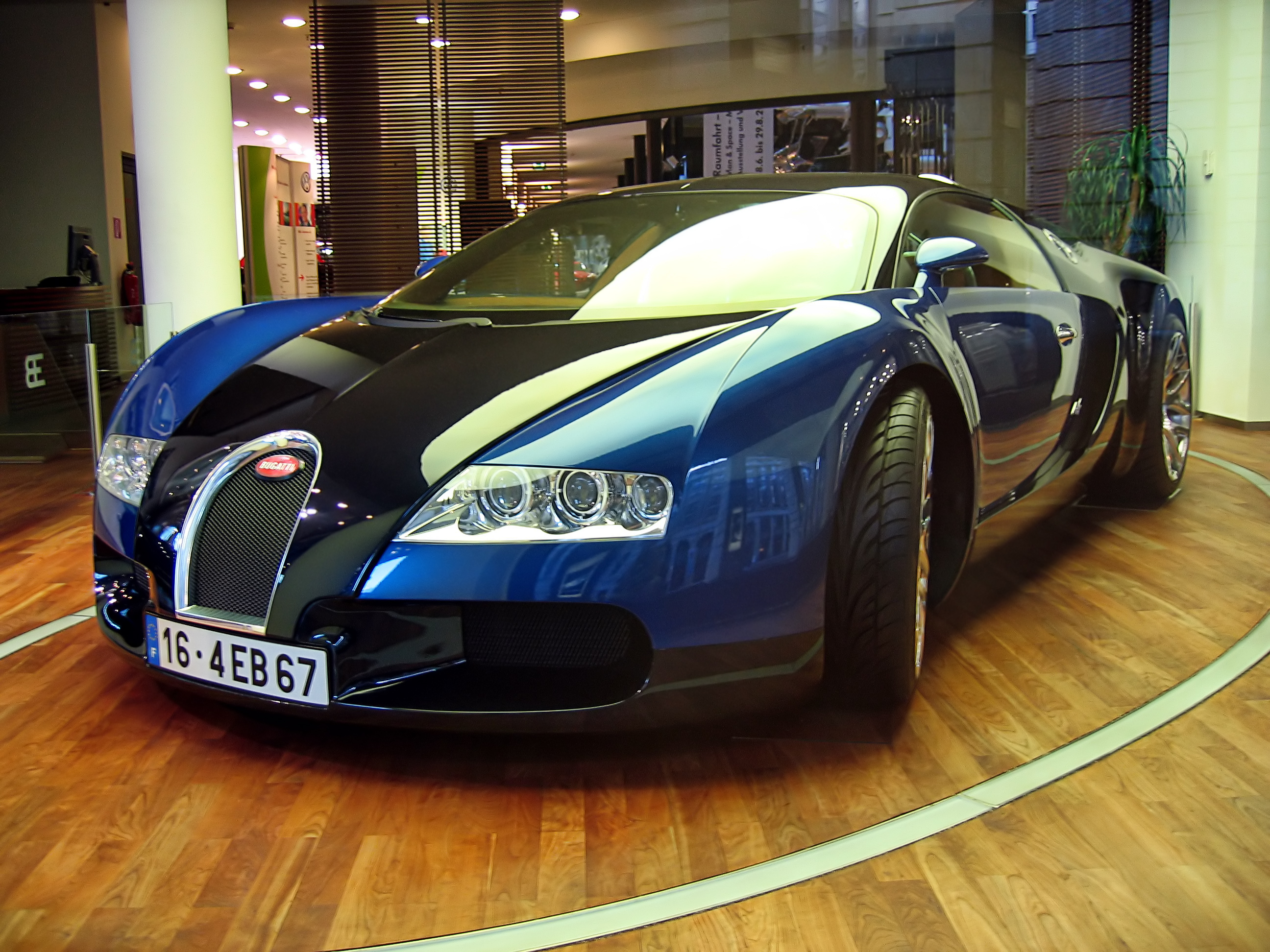
Automobile at VW Forum

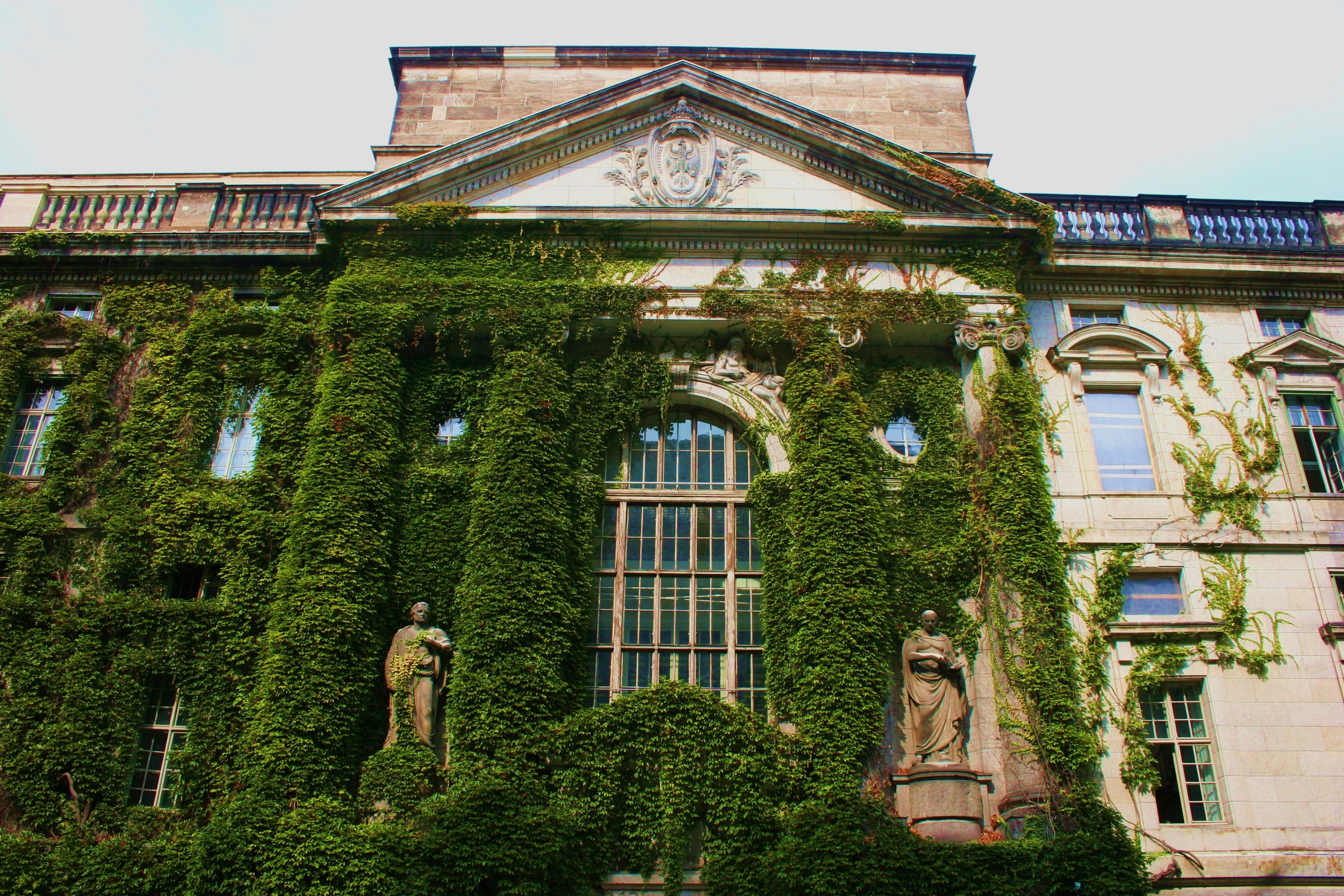
Staatsbibliothek

== Entertainment venues ==
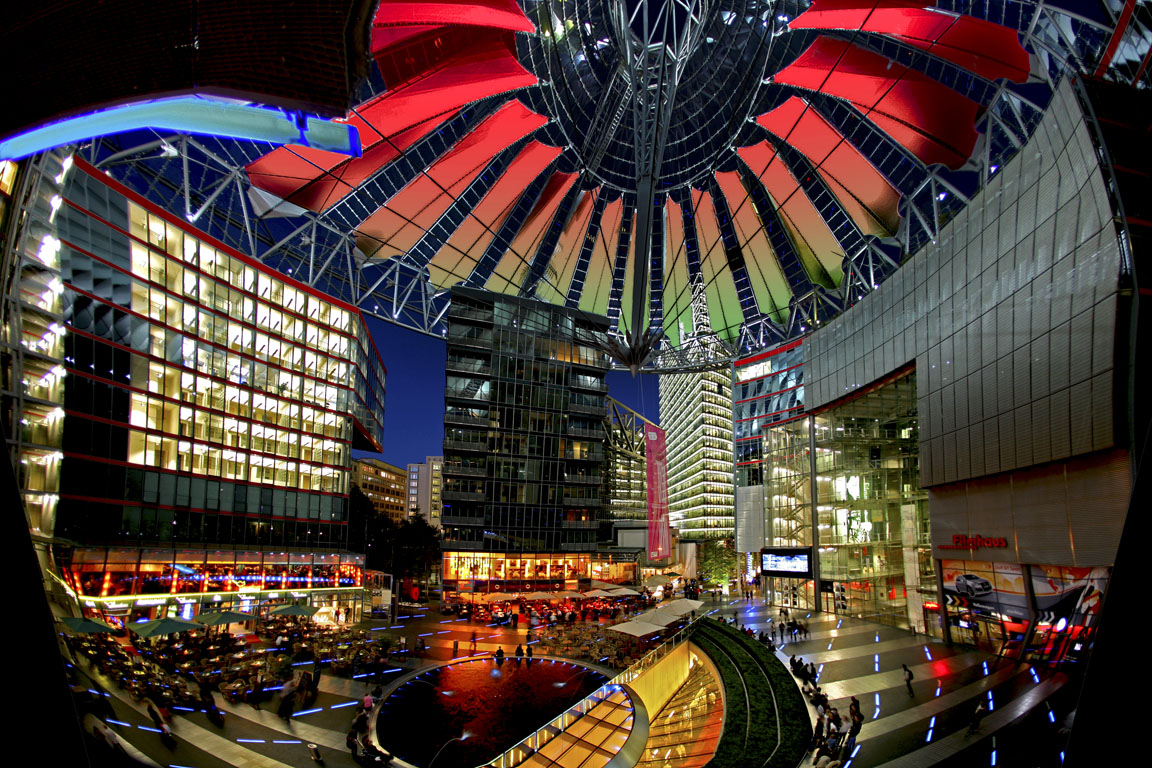
Inside the Sony Center

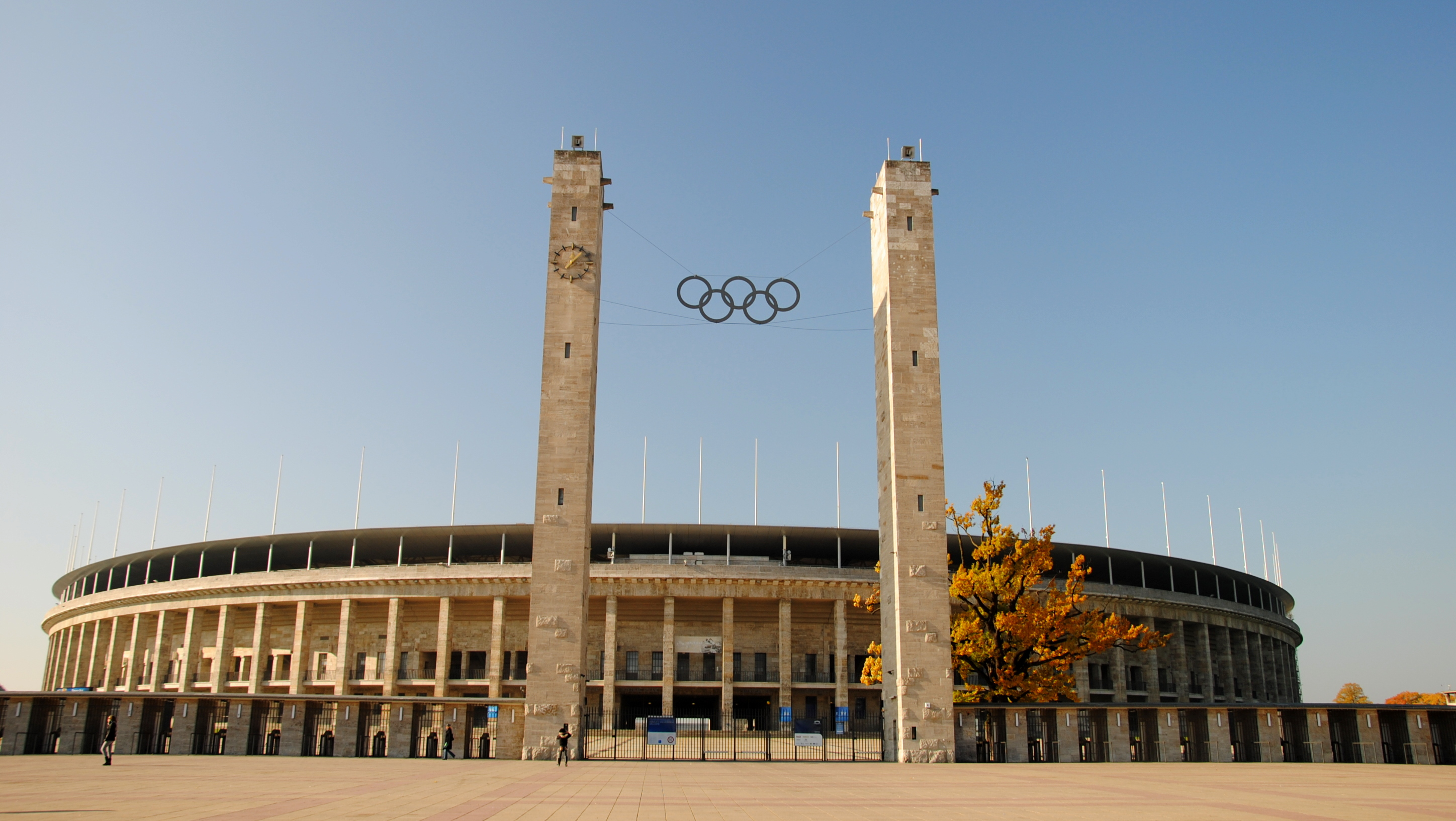
Olympic Stadium

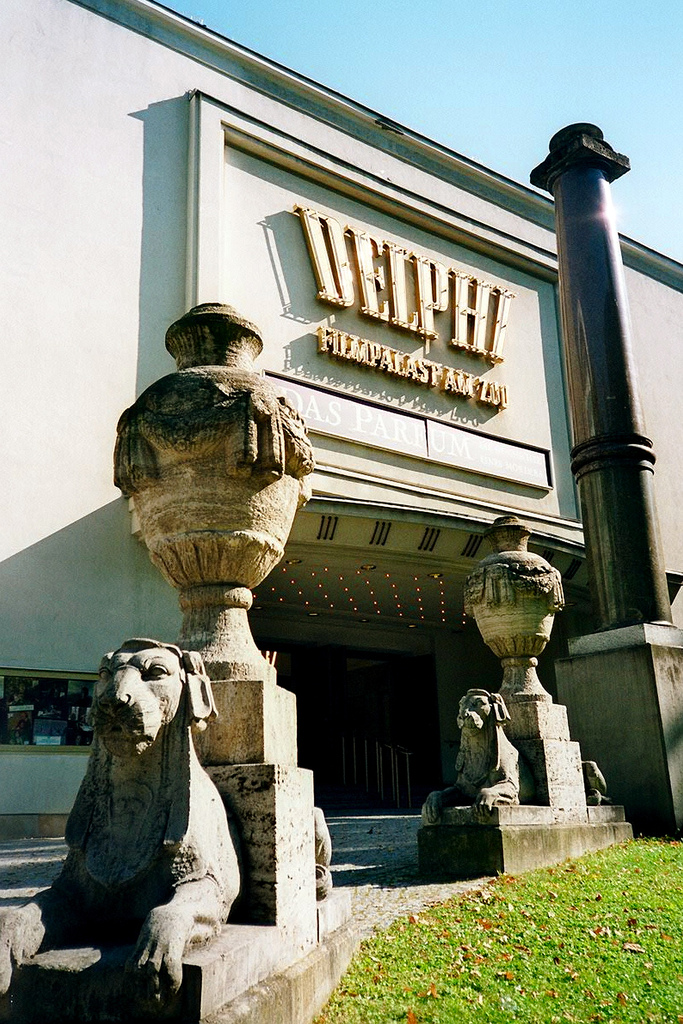
Delphi Filmpalast

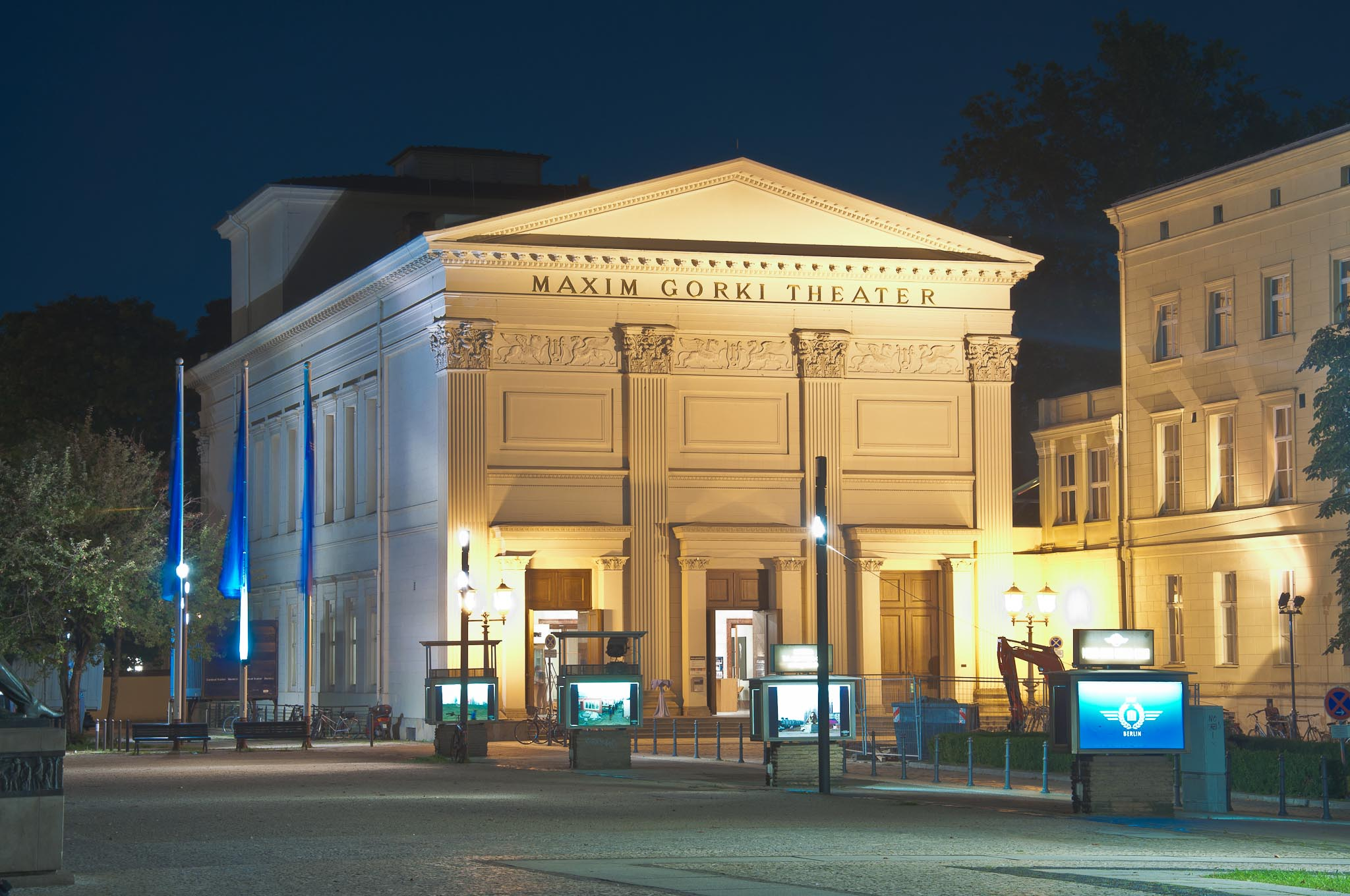
Maxim Gorki Theatre

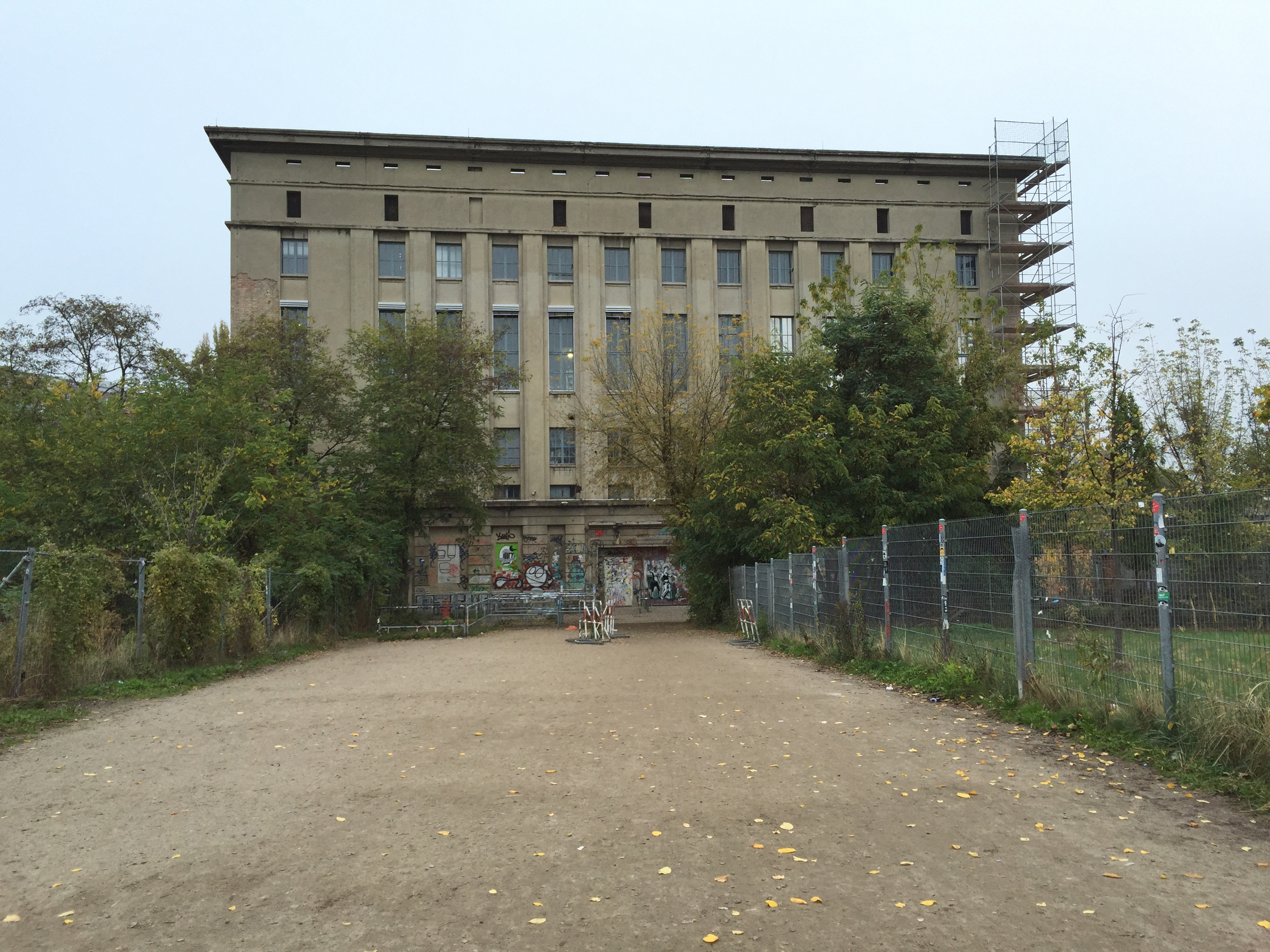
Berghain club

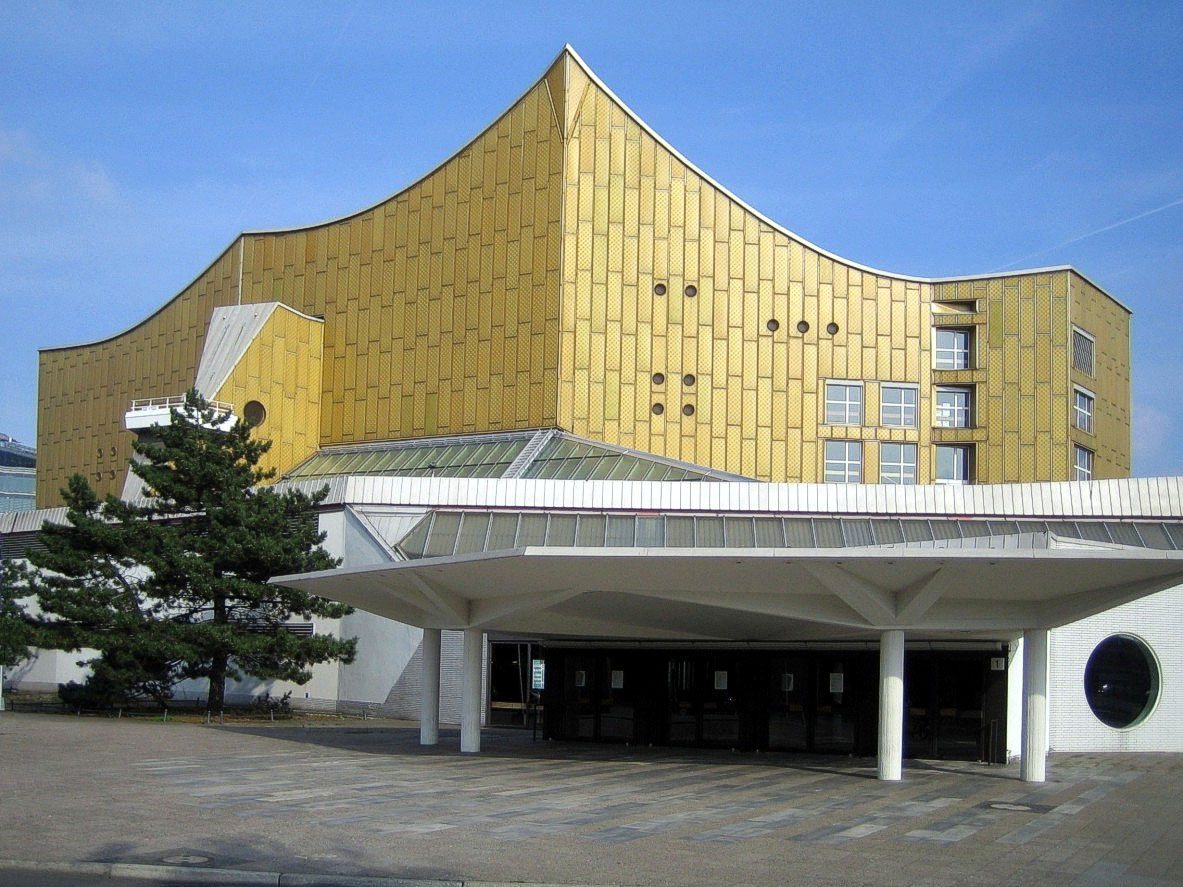
Berliner Philharmonie

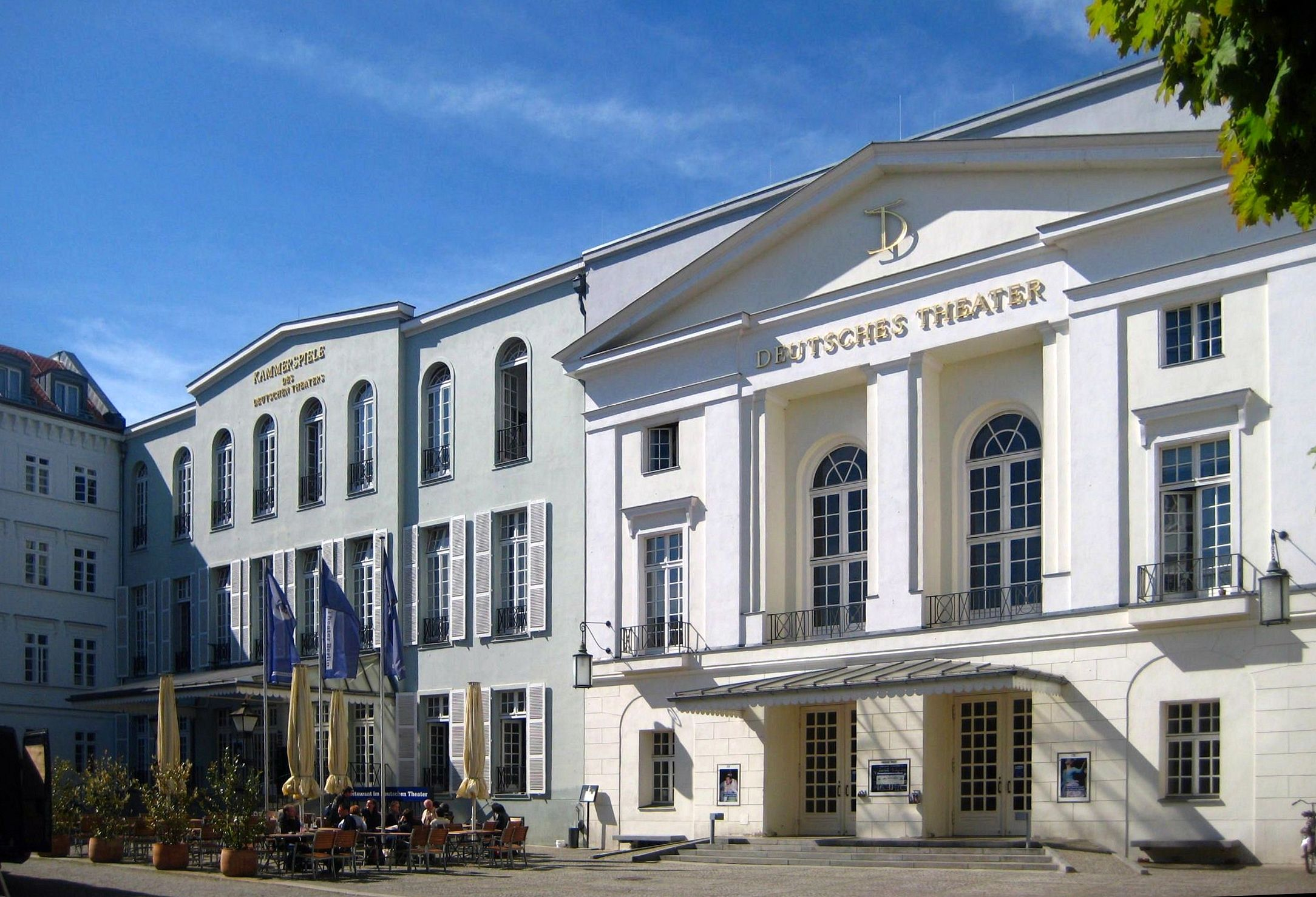
Deutsches Theater

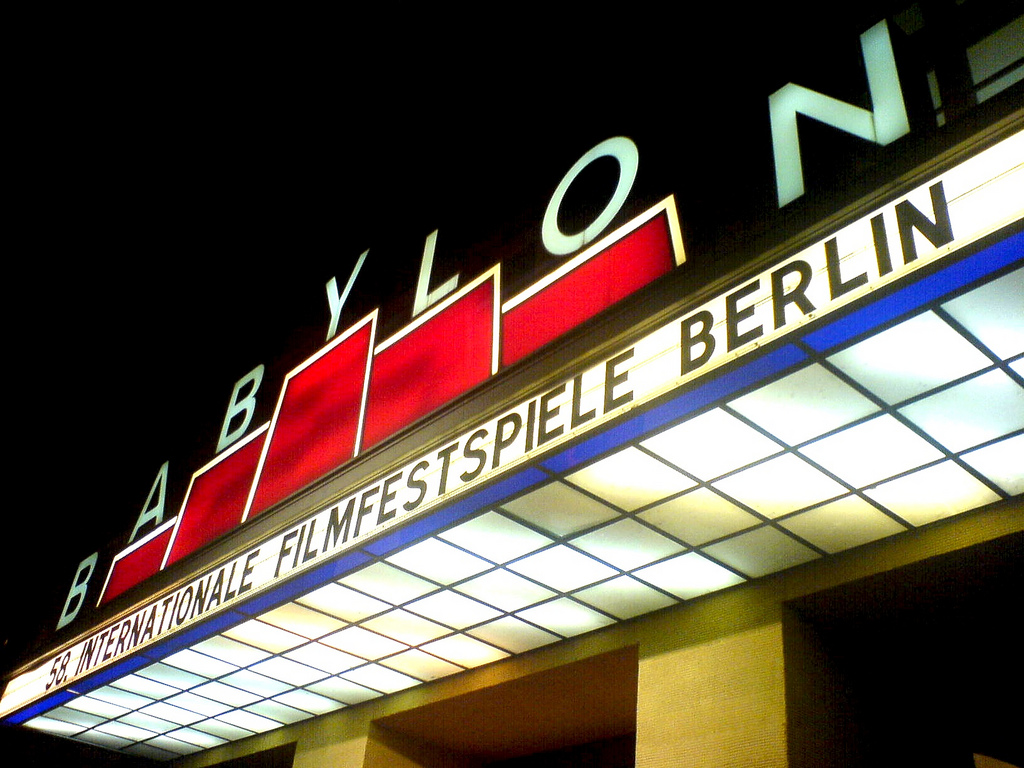
Babylon Cinema

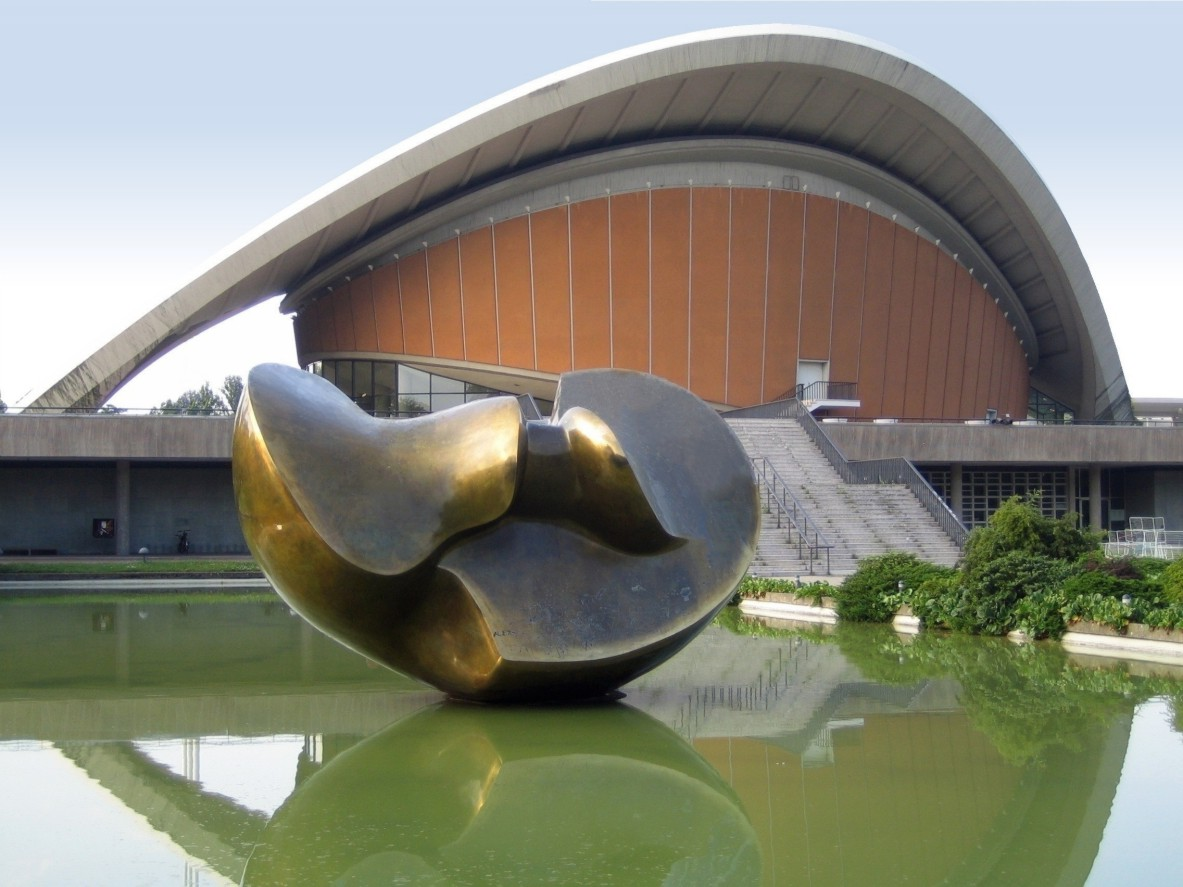
Haus der Kulturen der Welt

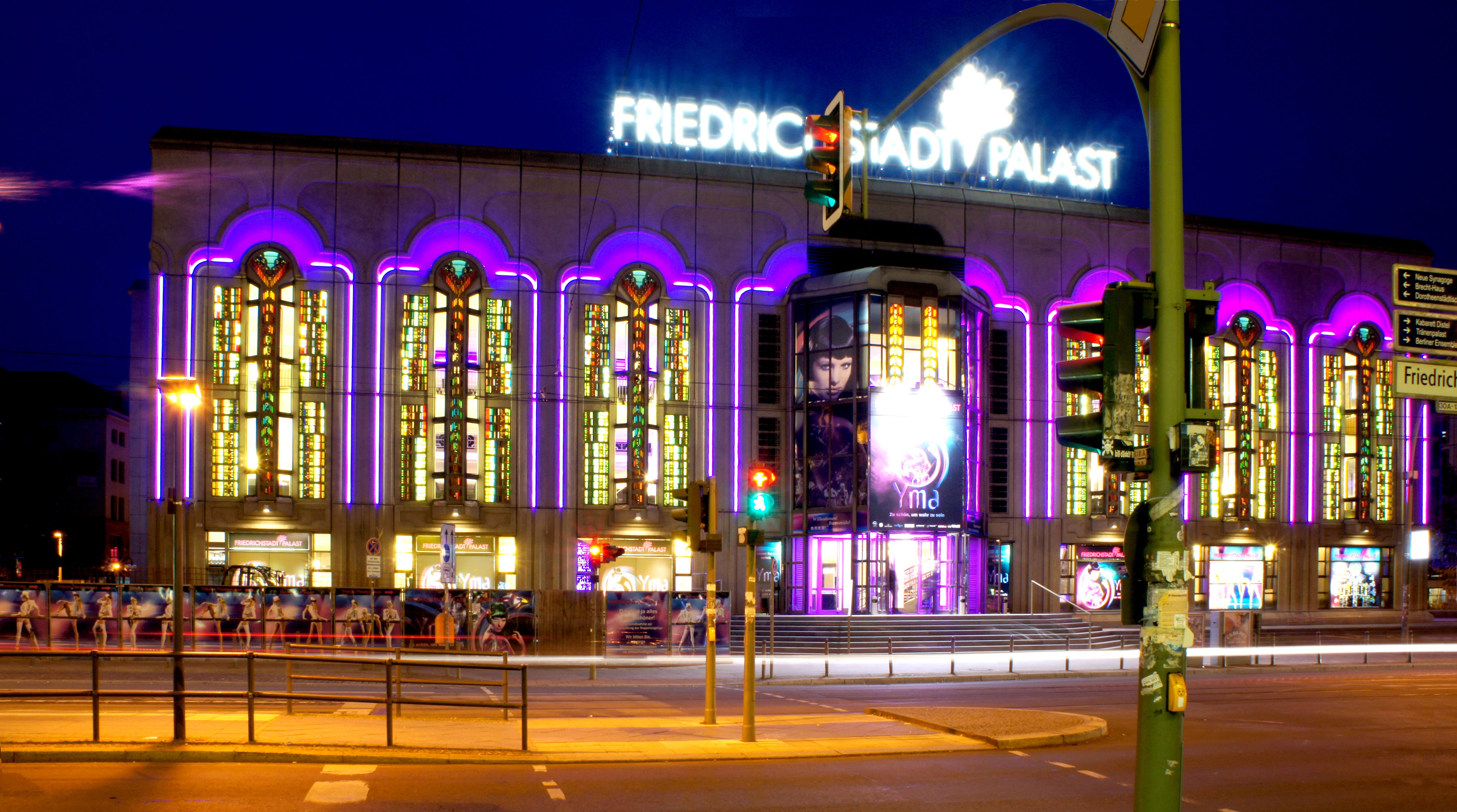
Friedrichstadt-Palast

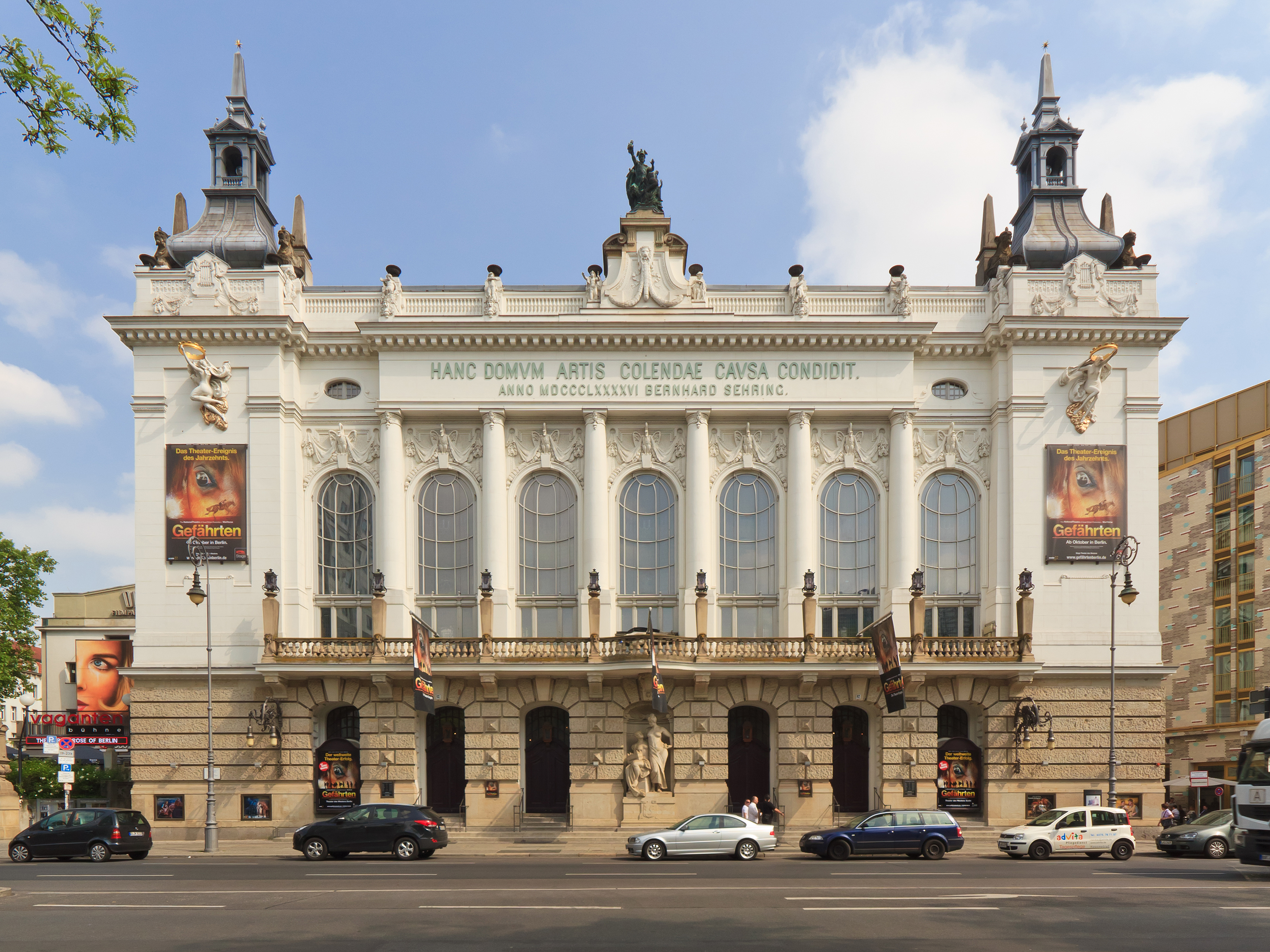
Theater des Westens

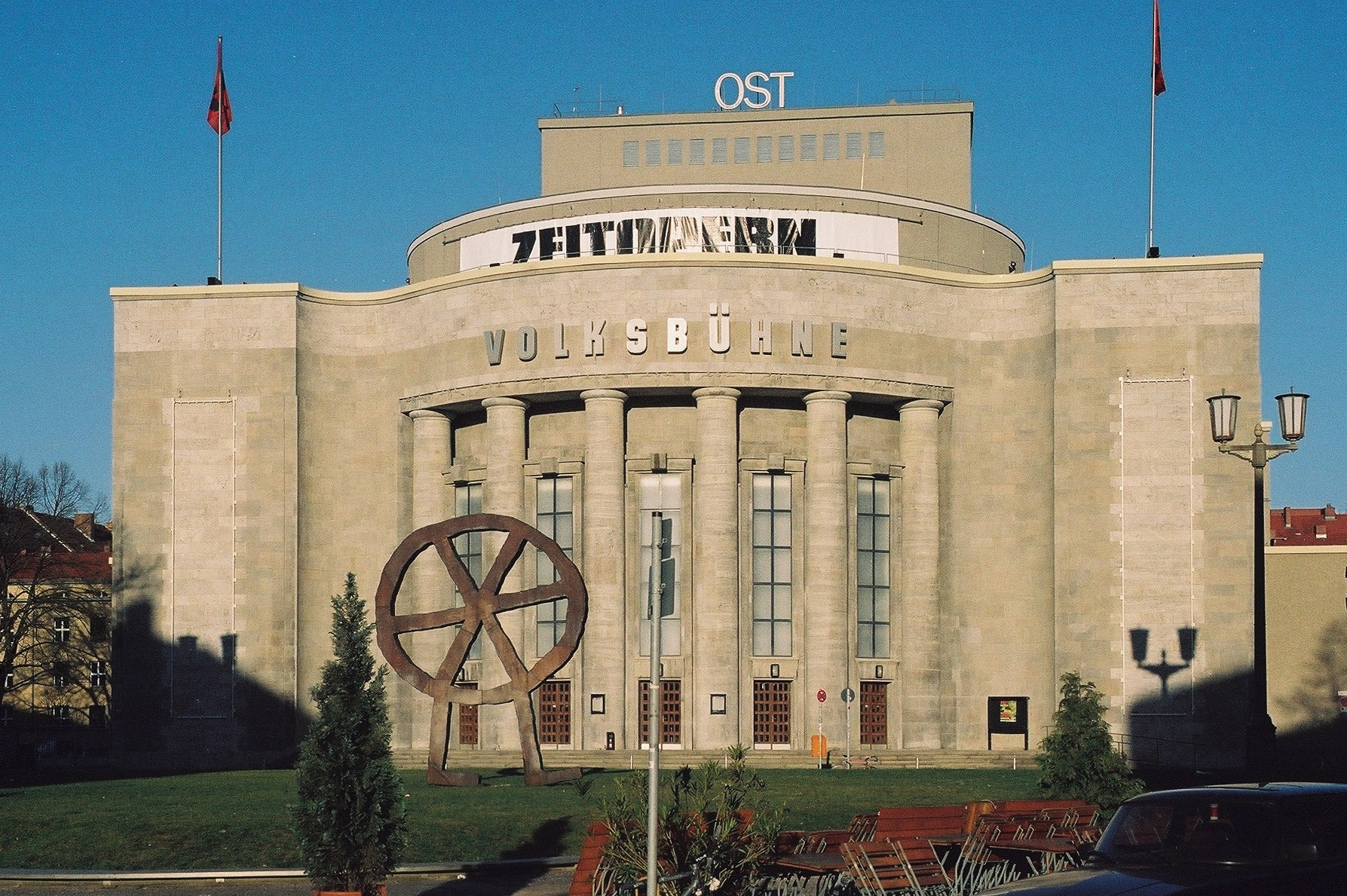
Volksbühne

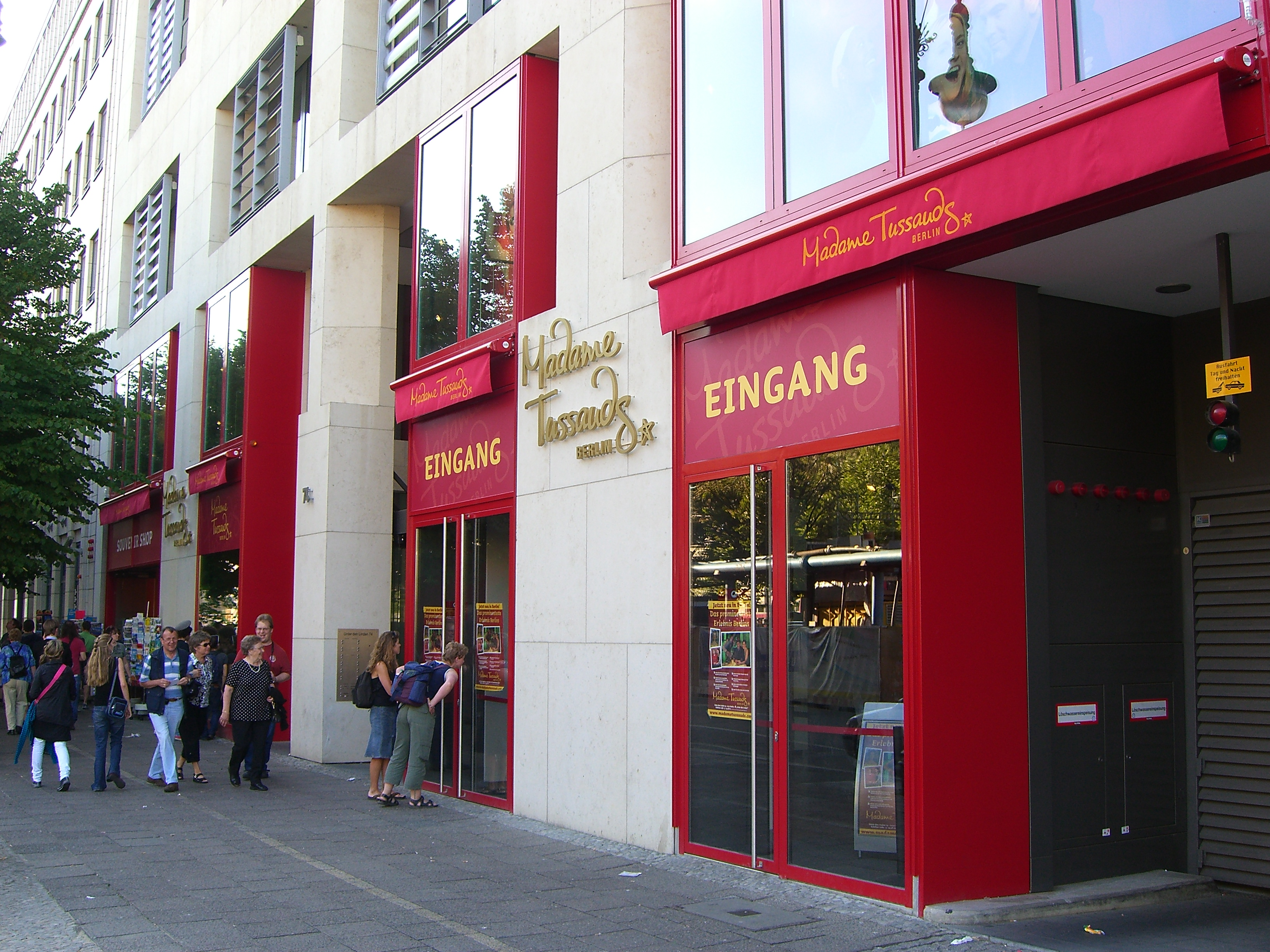
Madame Tussauds in Berlin

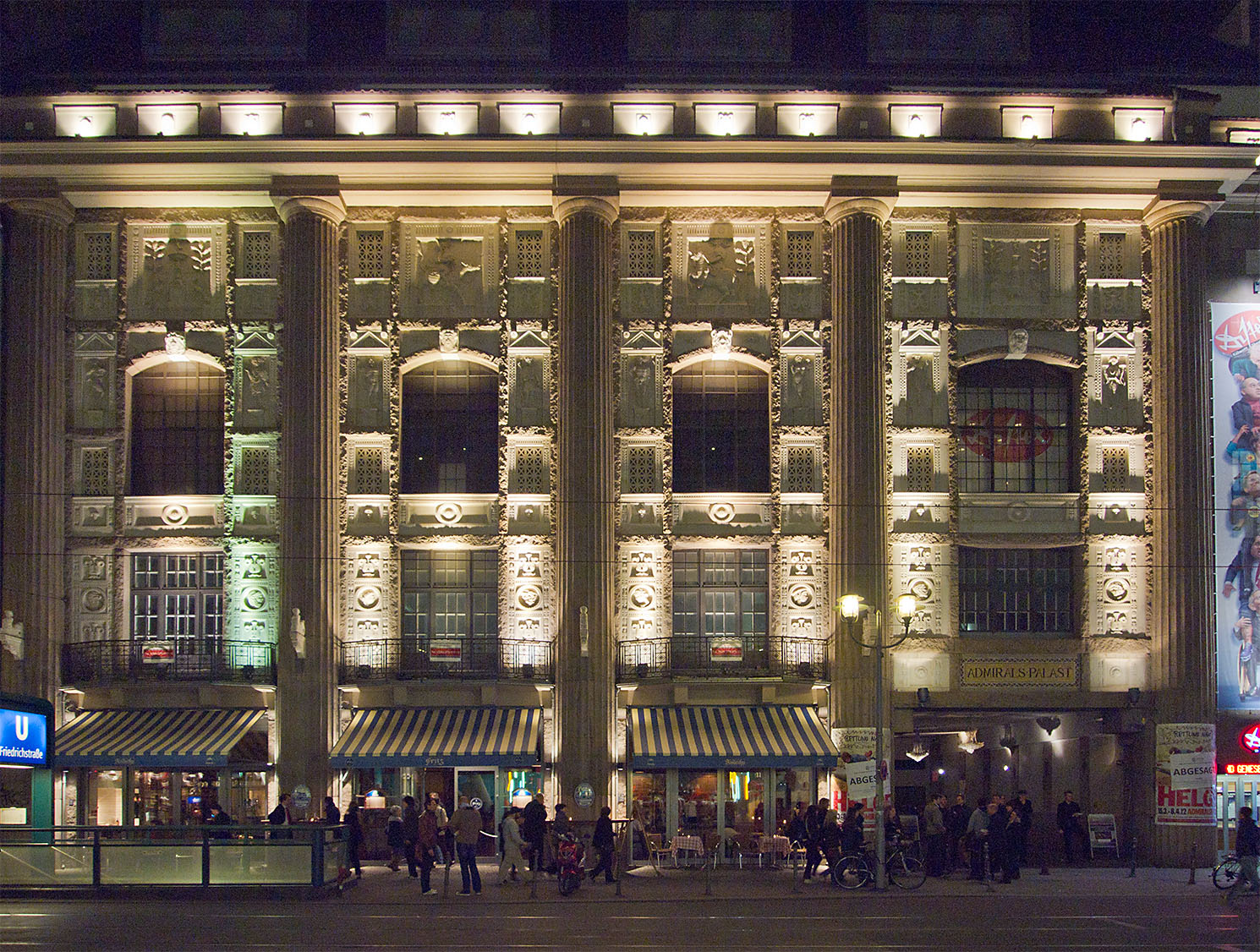
Admiralspalast

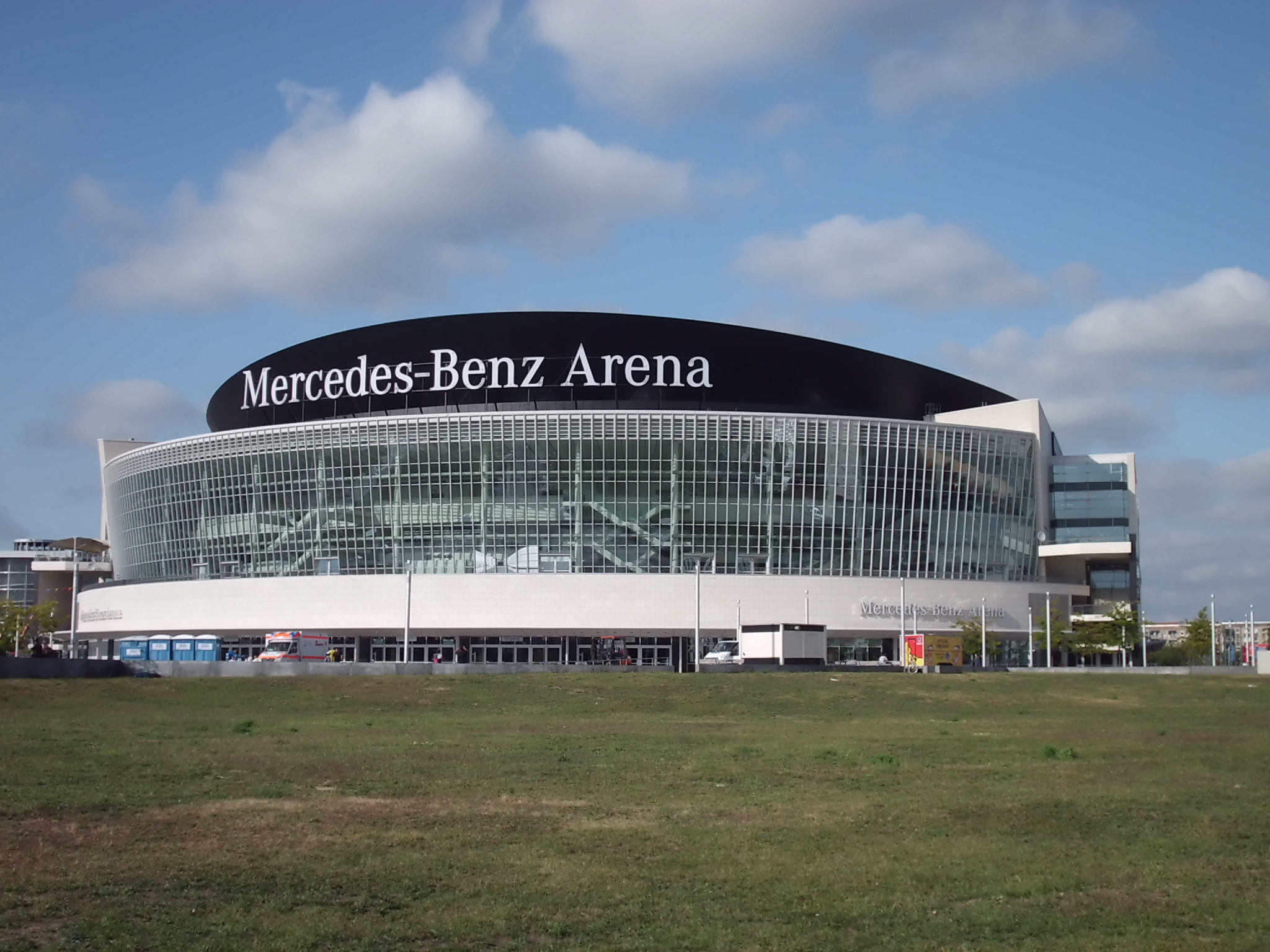
Mercedes-Benz Arena (Berlin)

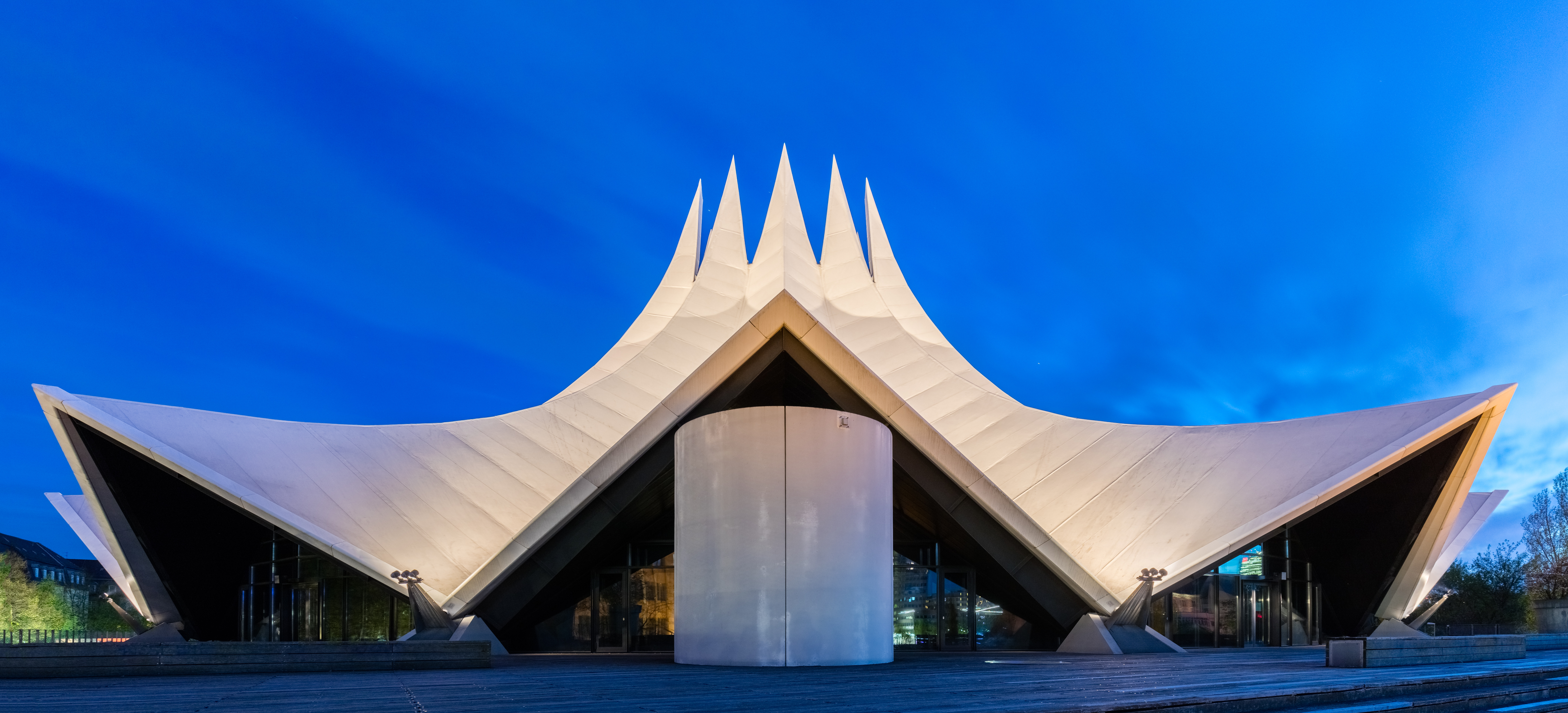
Tempodrom (and Liquidrom)

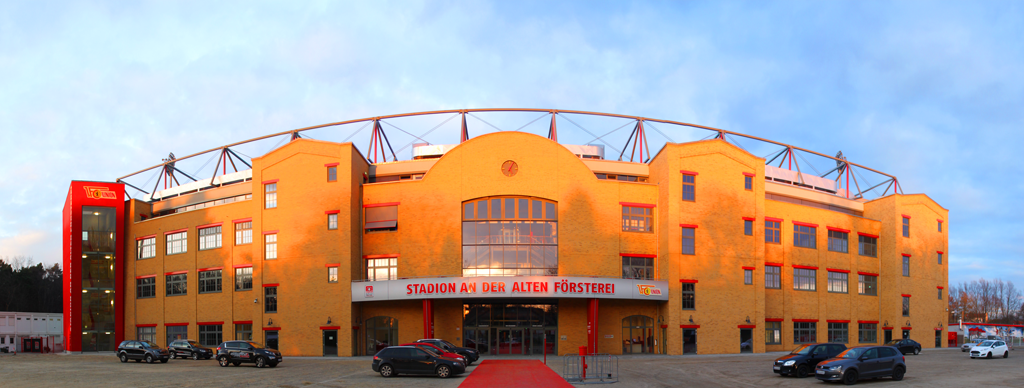
Stadion An der Alten Försterei

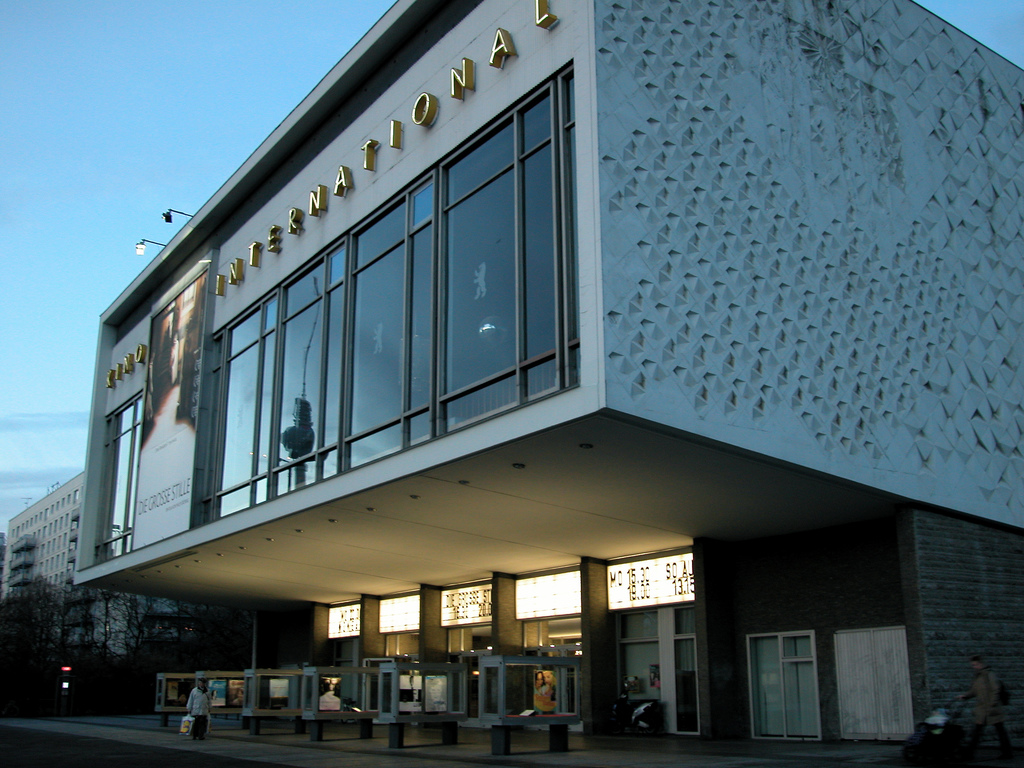
Kino International

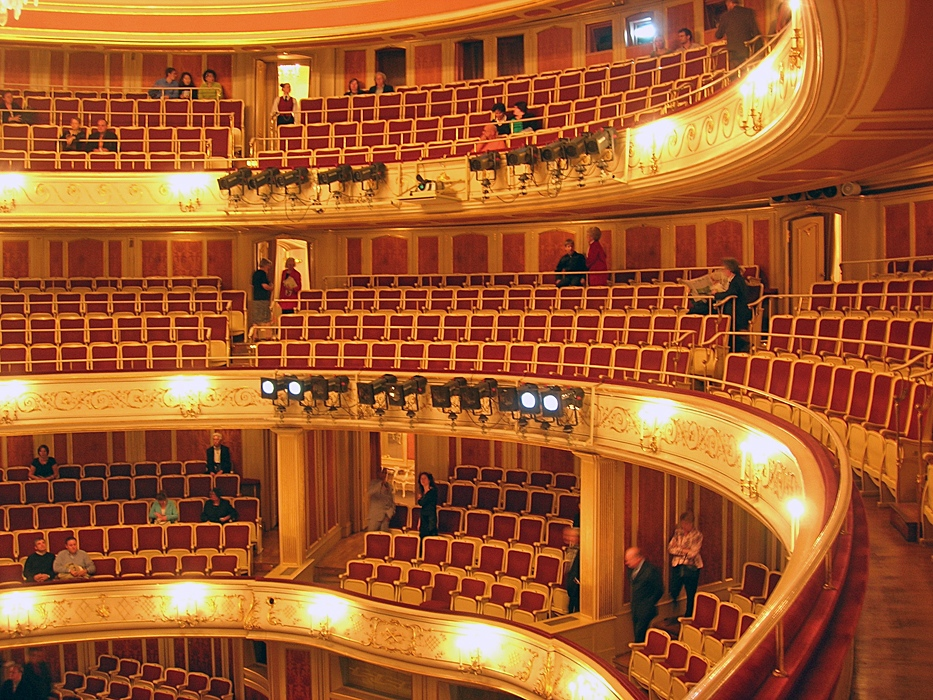
Inside Berlin State Opera

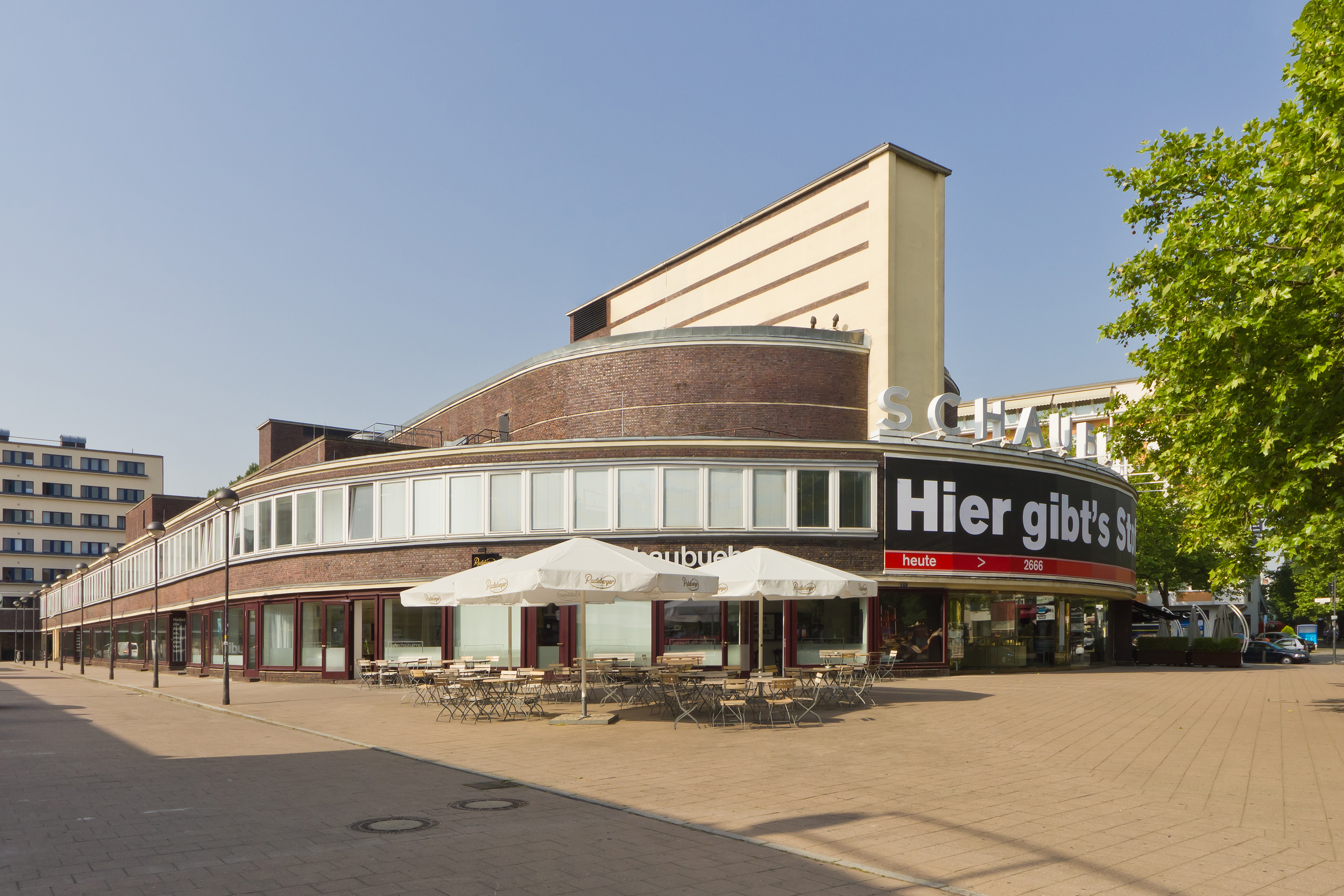
Schaubühne in Charlottenburg

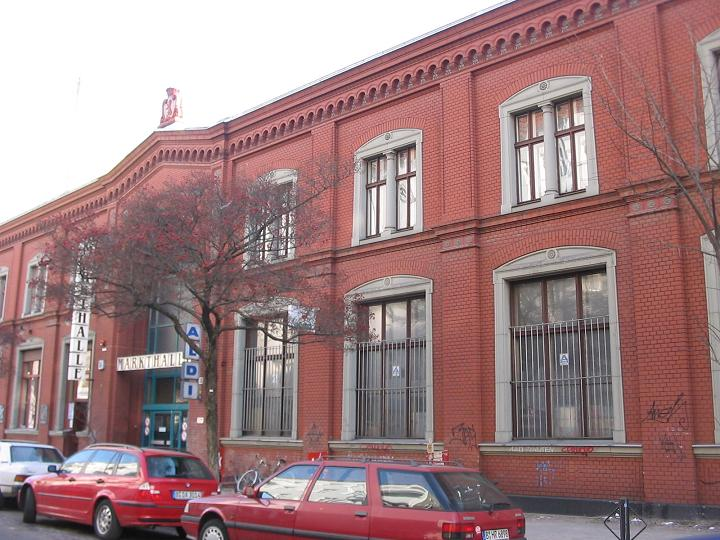
Markthalle 9 (Street Food)

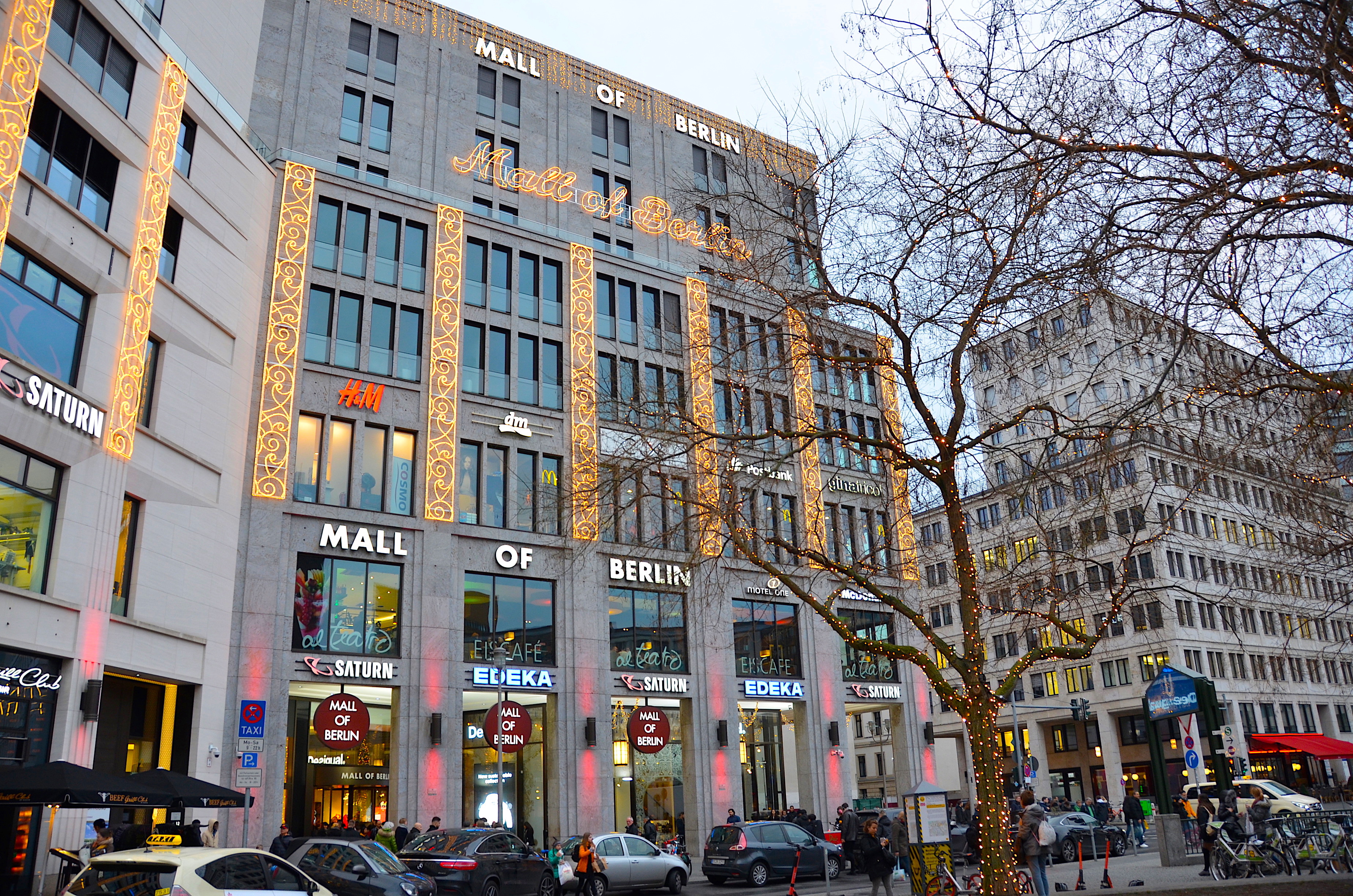
Shopping Center LP12 Mall of Berlin

== Notable buildings ==
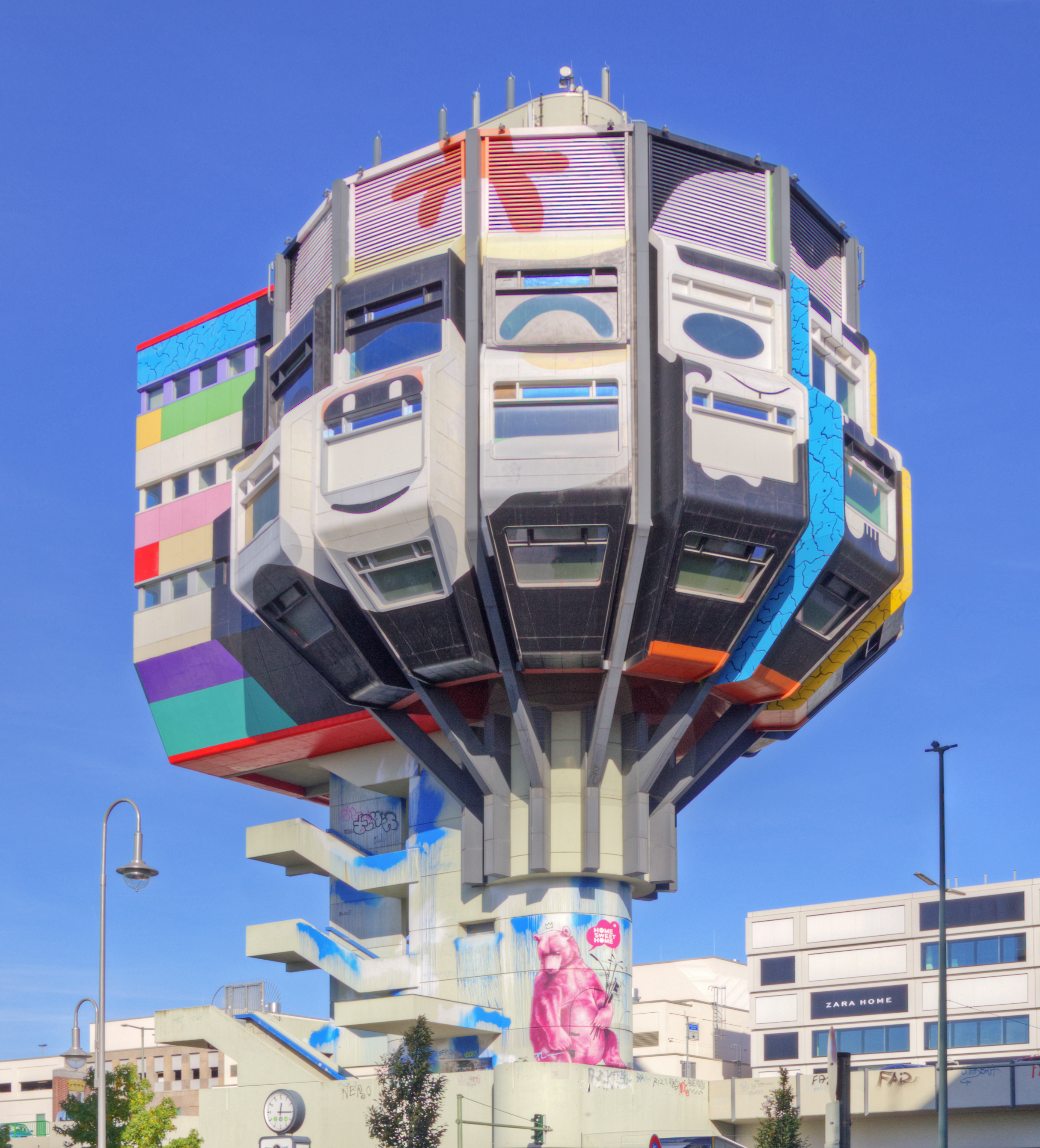
Bierpinsel

Alexanderplatz

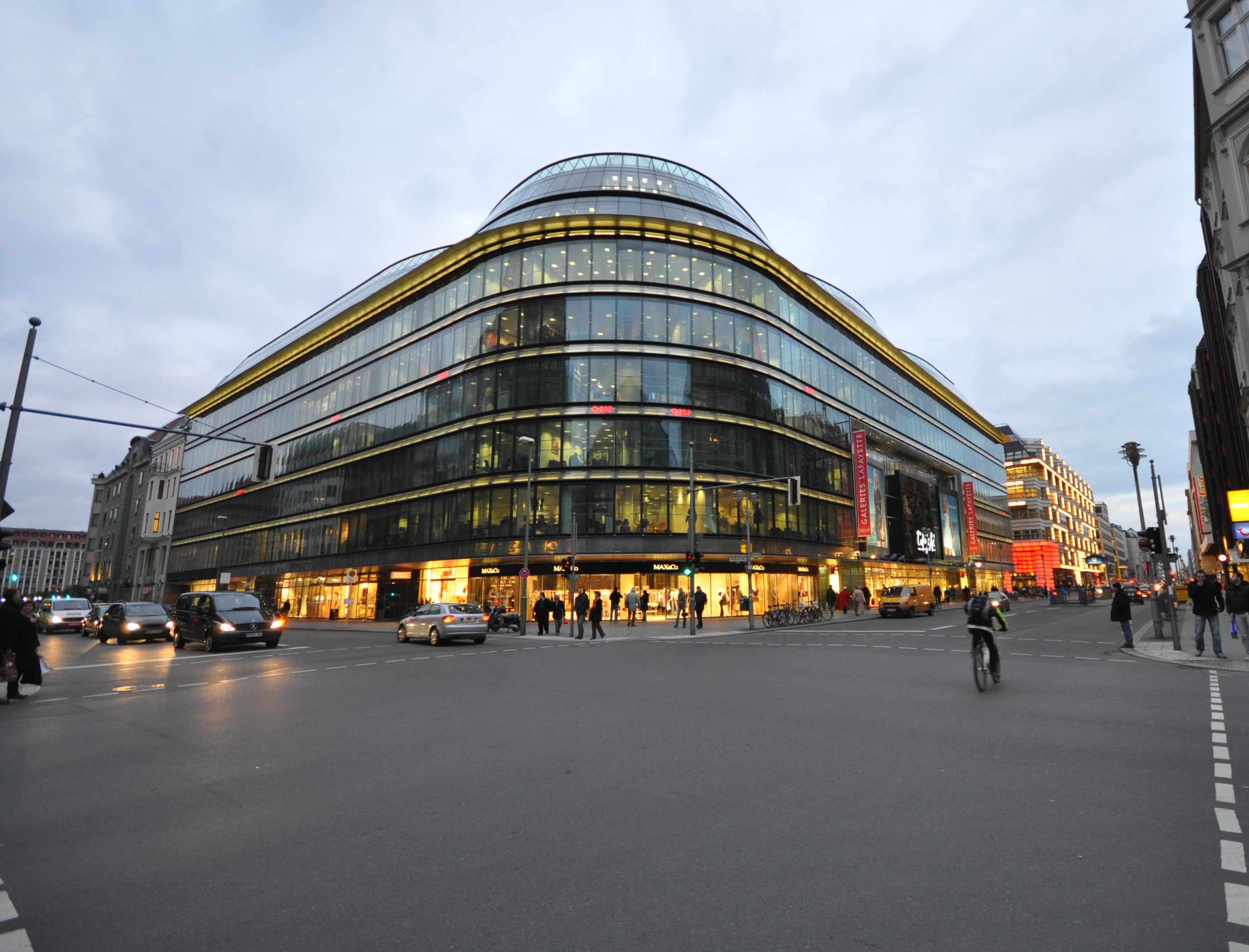
Quartier 207 - Galeries Lafayette

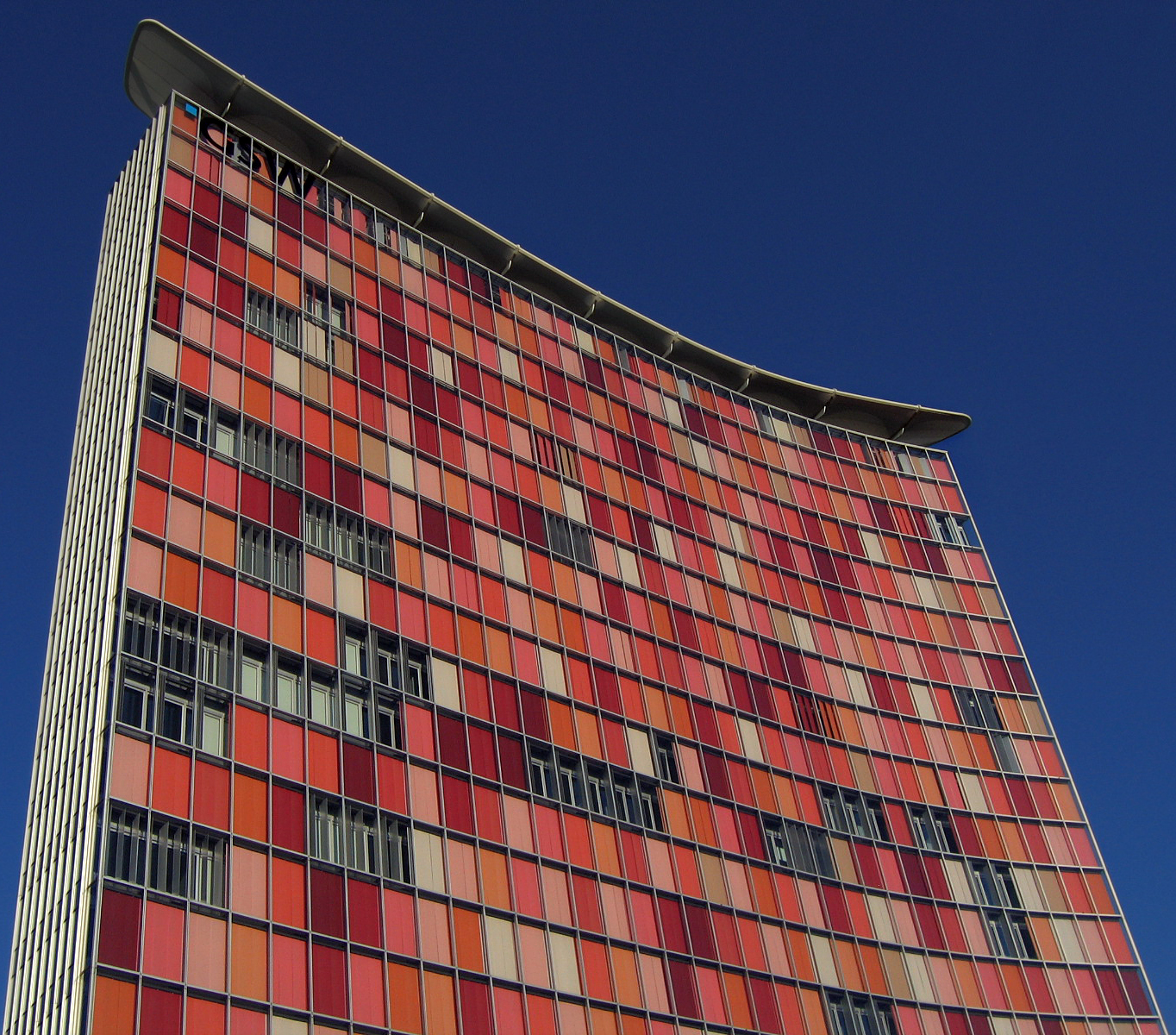
GSW Building

Charlottenburg Palace

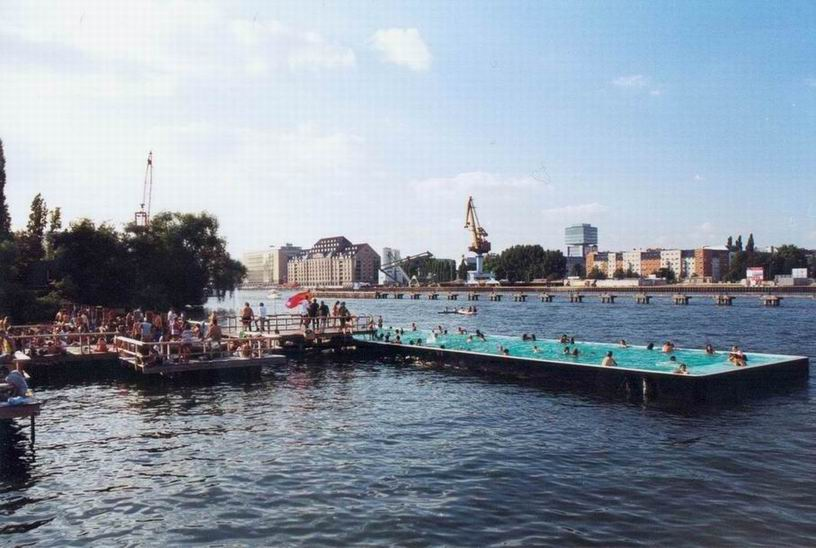
Badeschiff

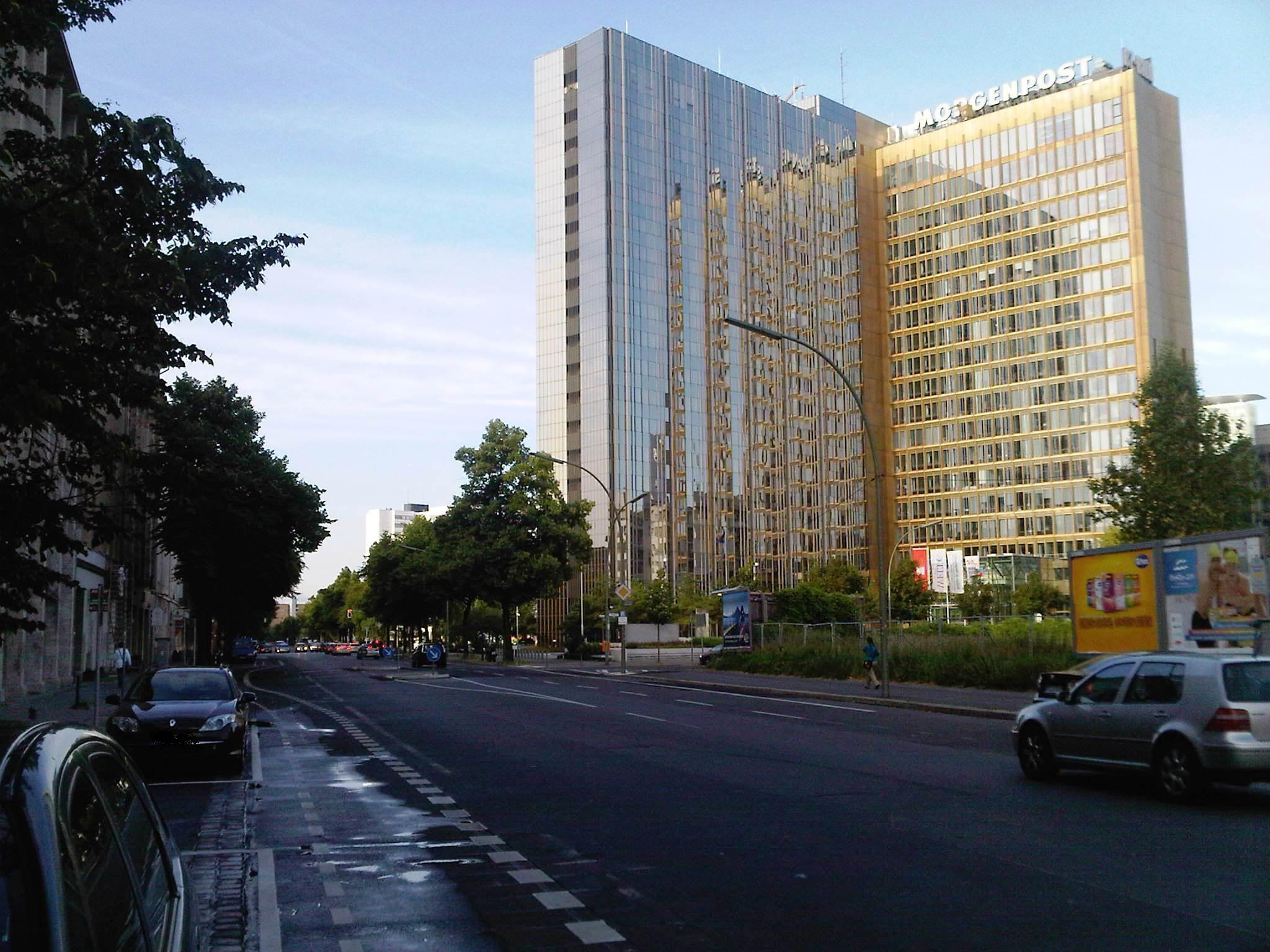
Axel Springer headquarter

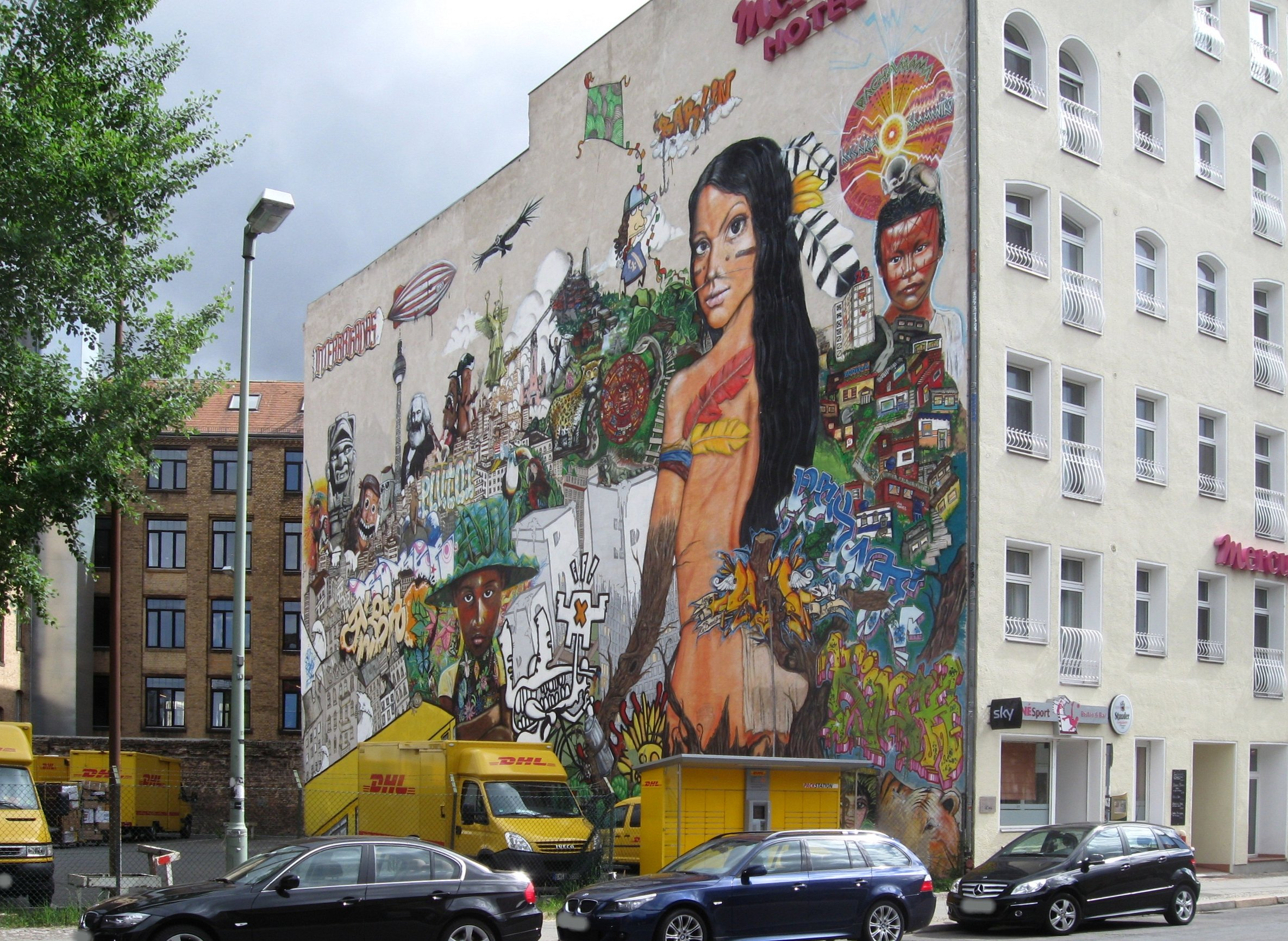
Urban mural

Humboldt University

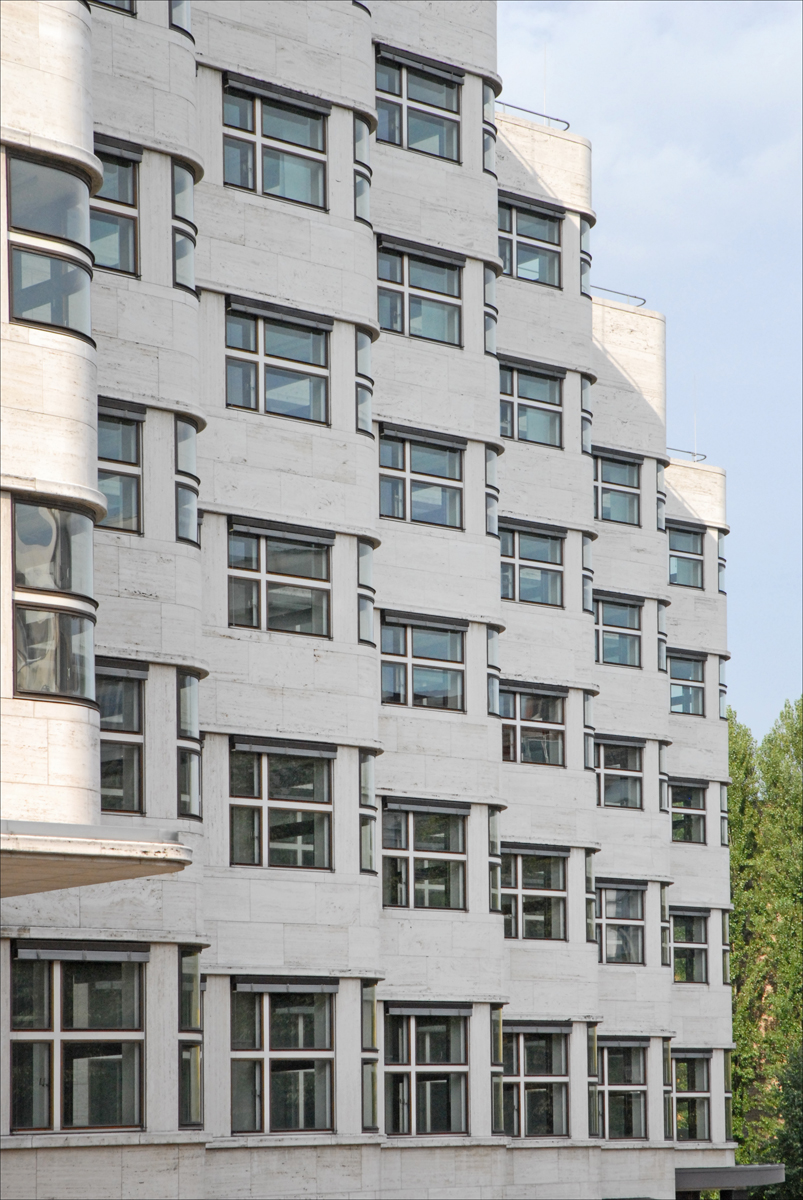
Shellhaus

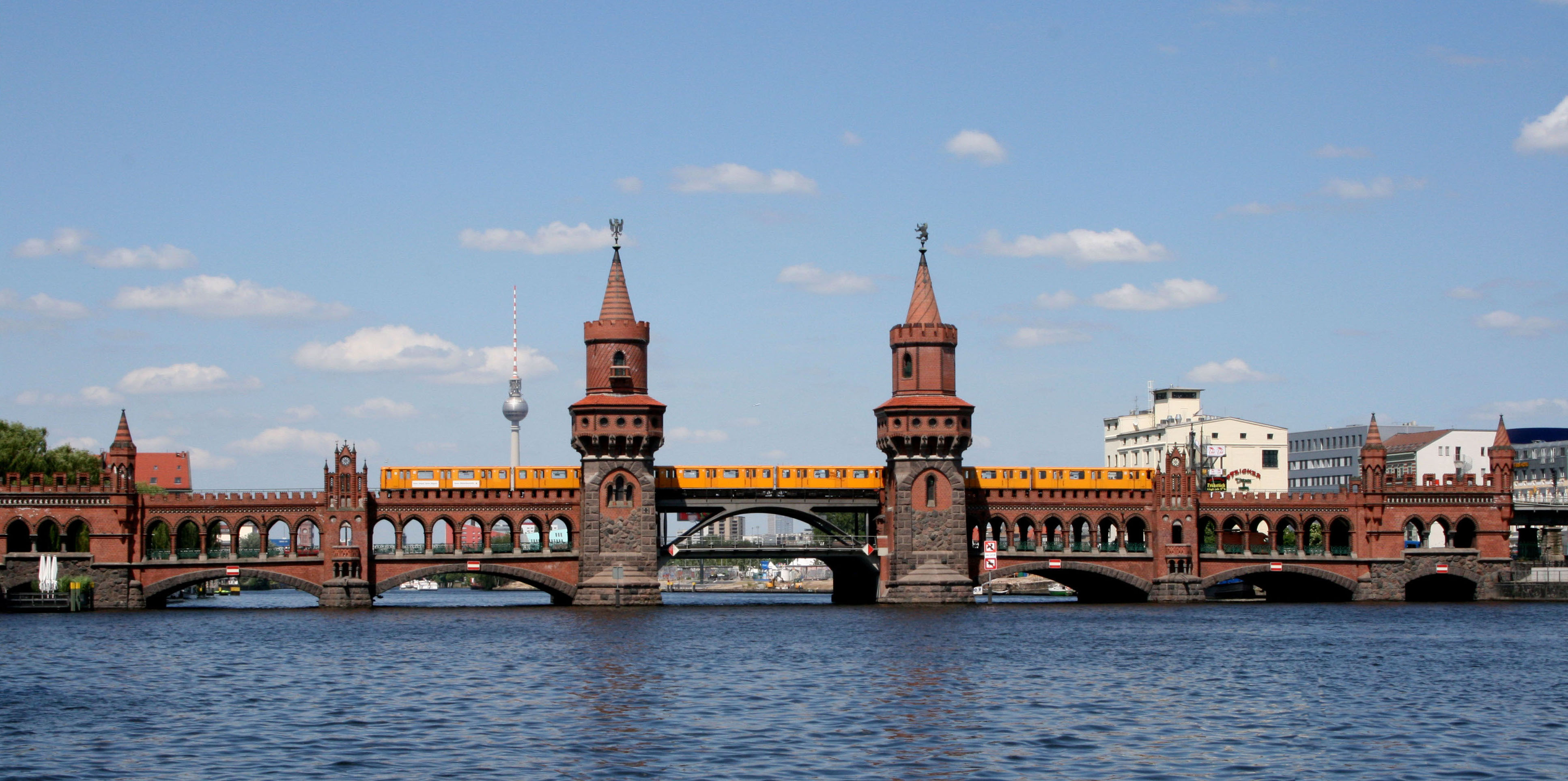
Oberbaum Bridge

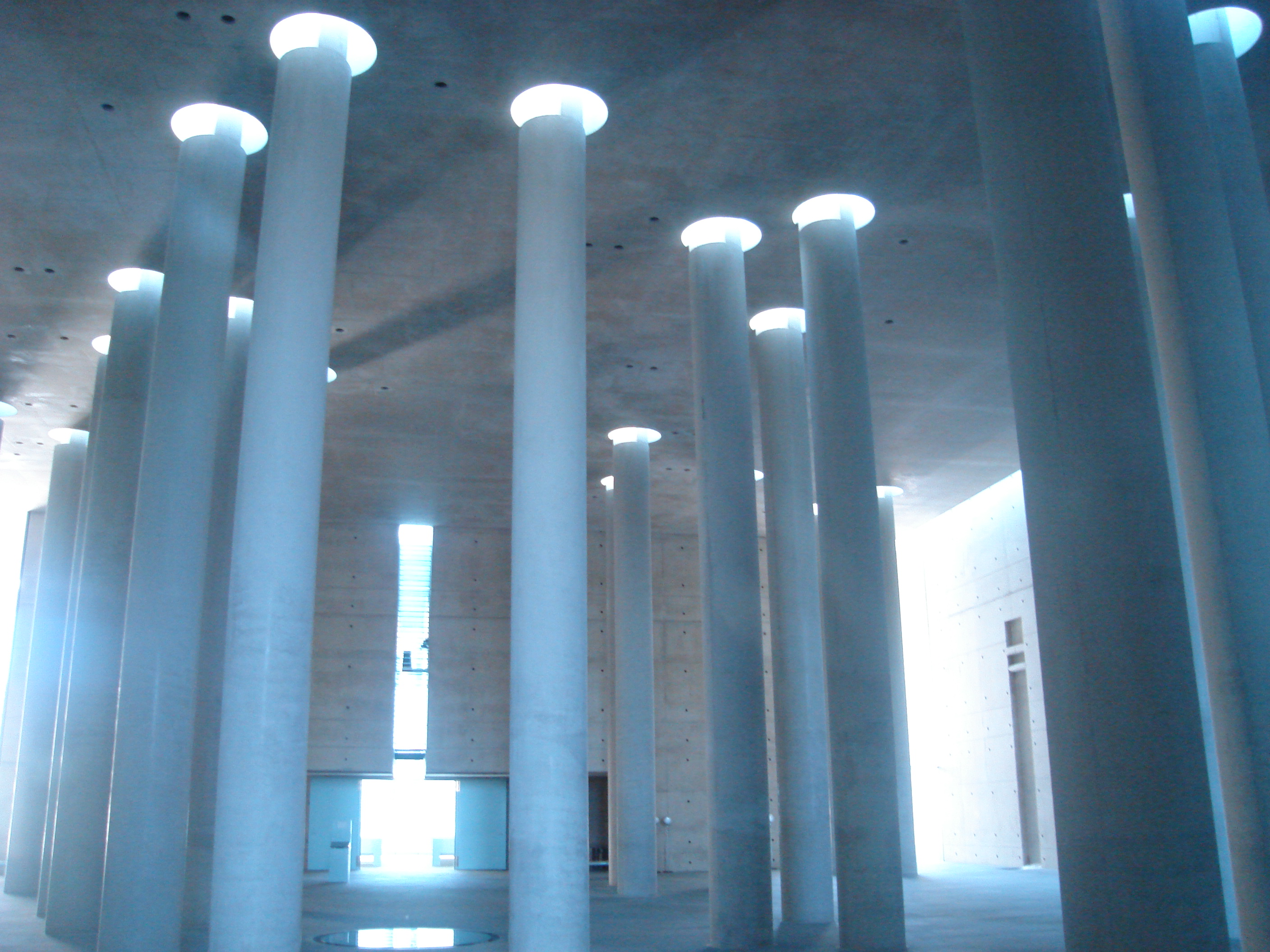
Krematorium Berlin-Baumschulenweg

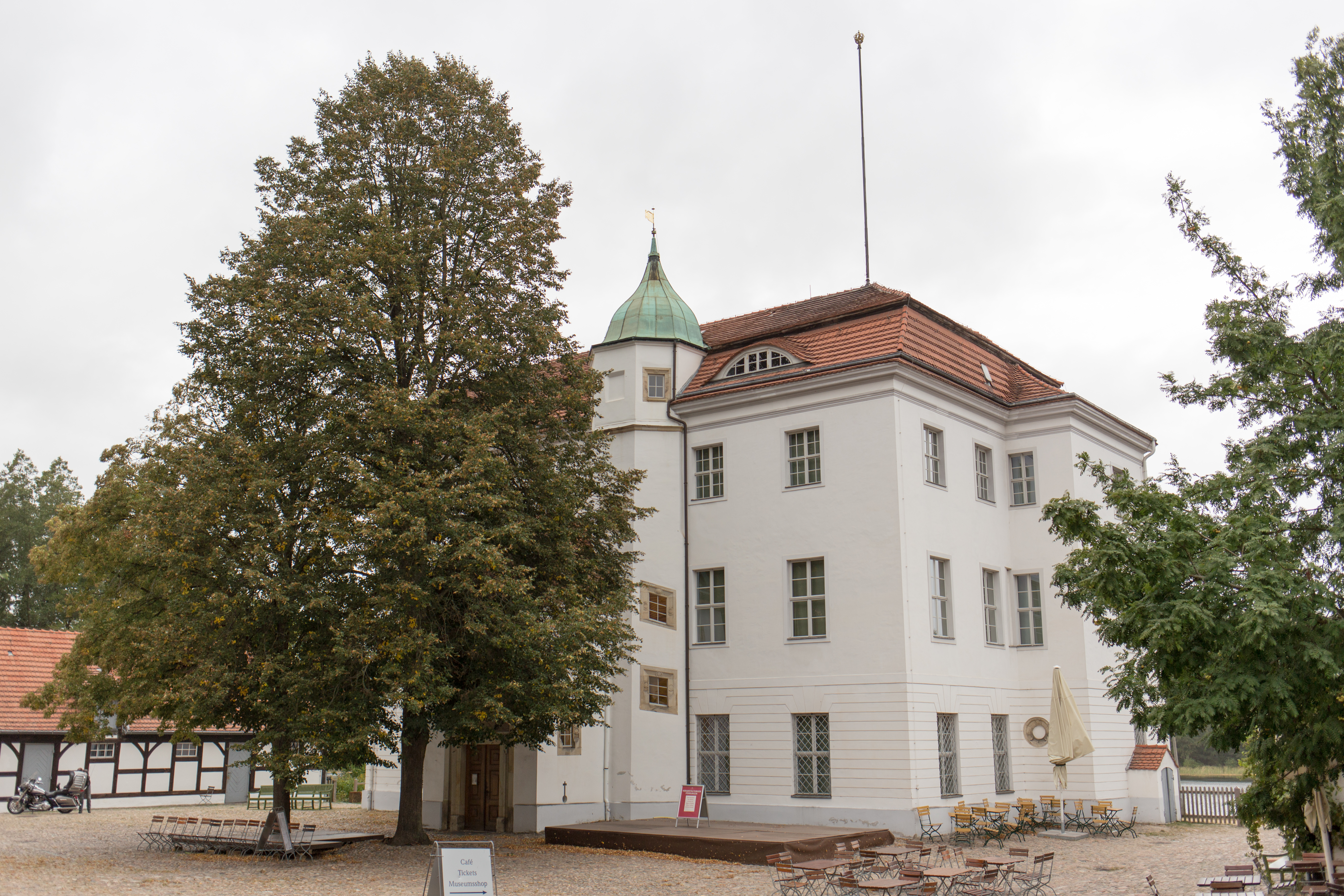
Jagdschloss Grunewald

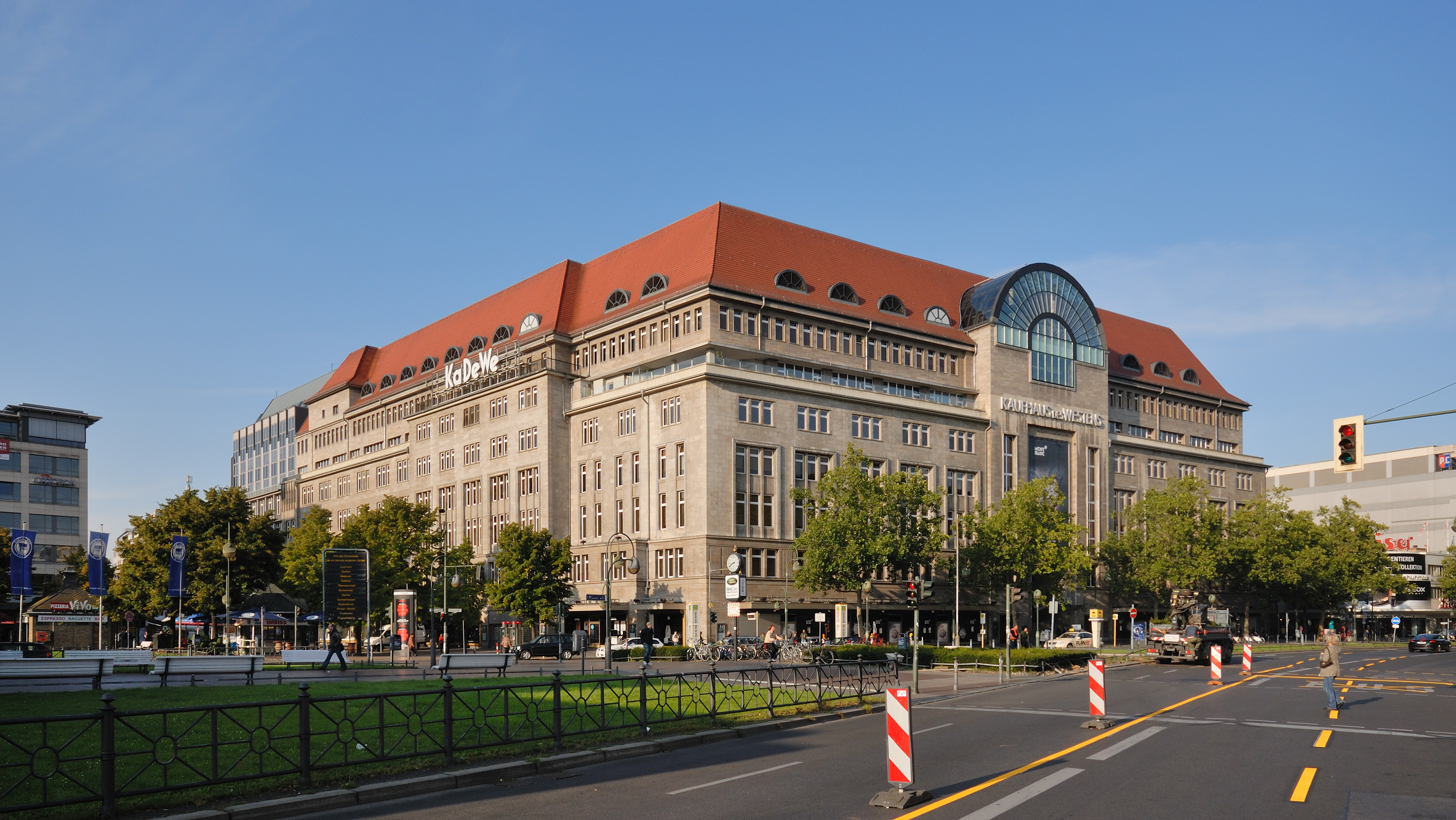
The Kaufhaus des Westens department store

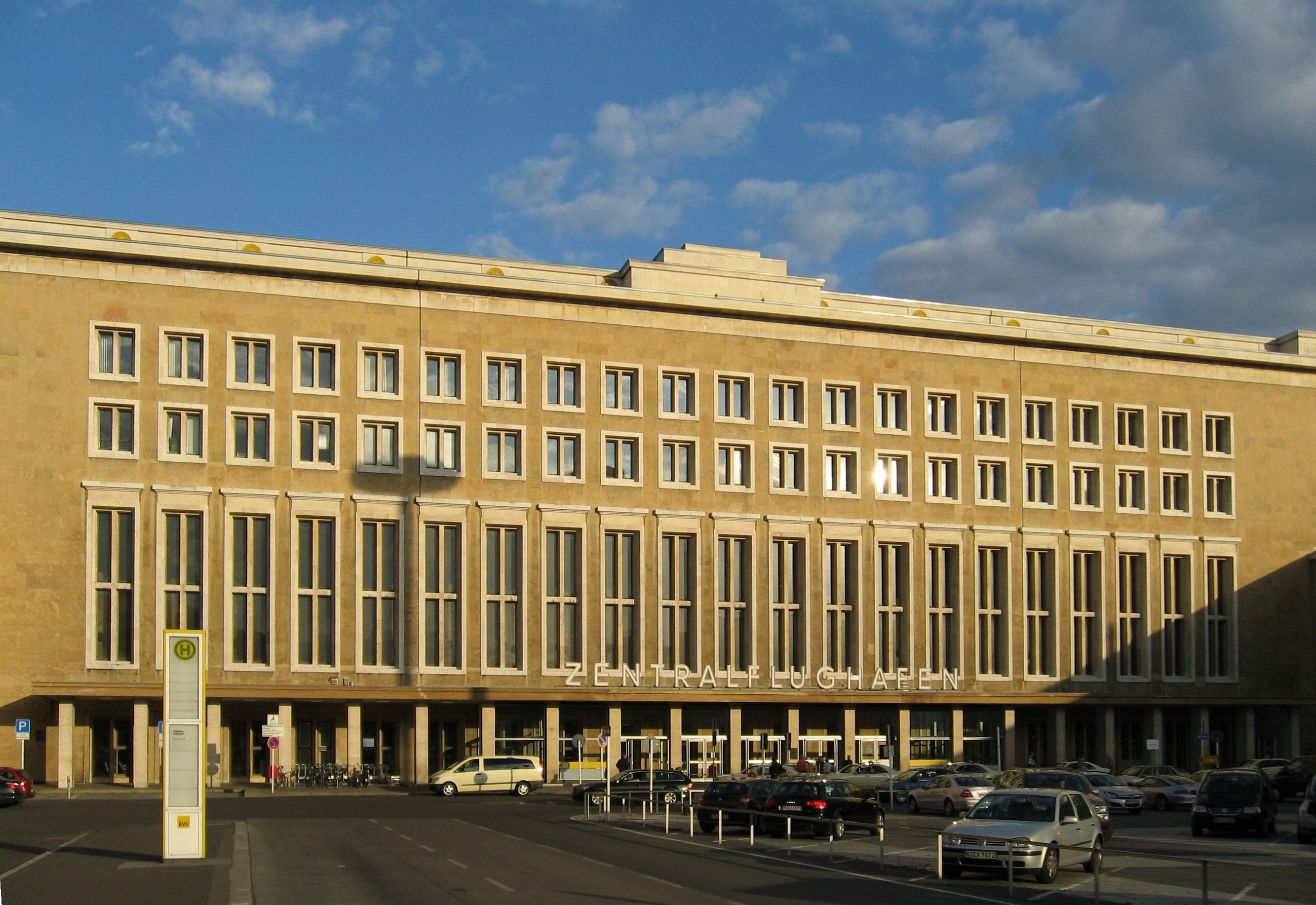
Main building of former Tempelhof Airport

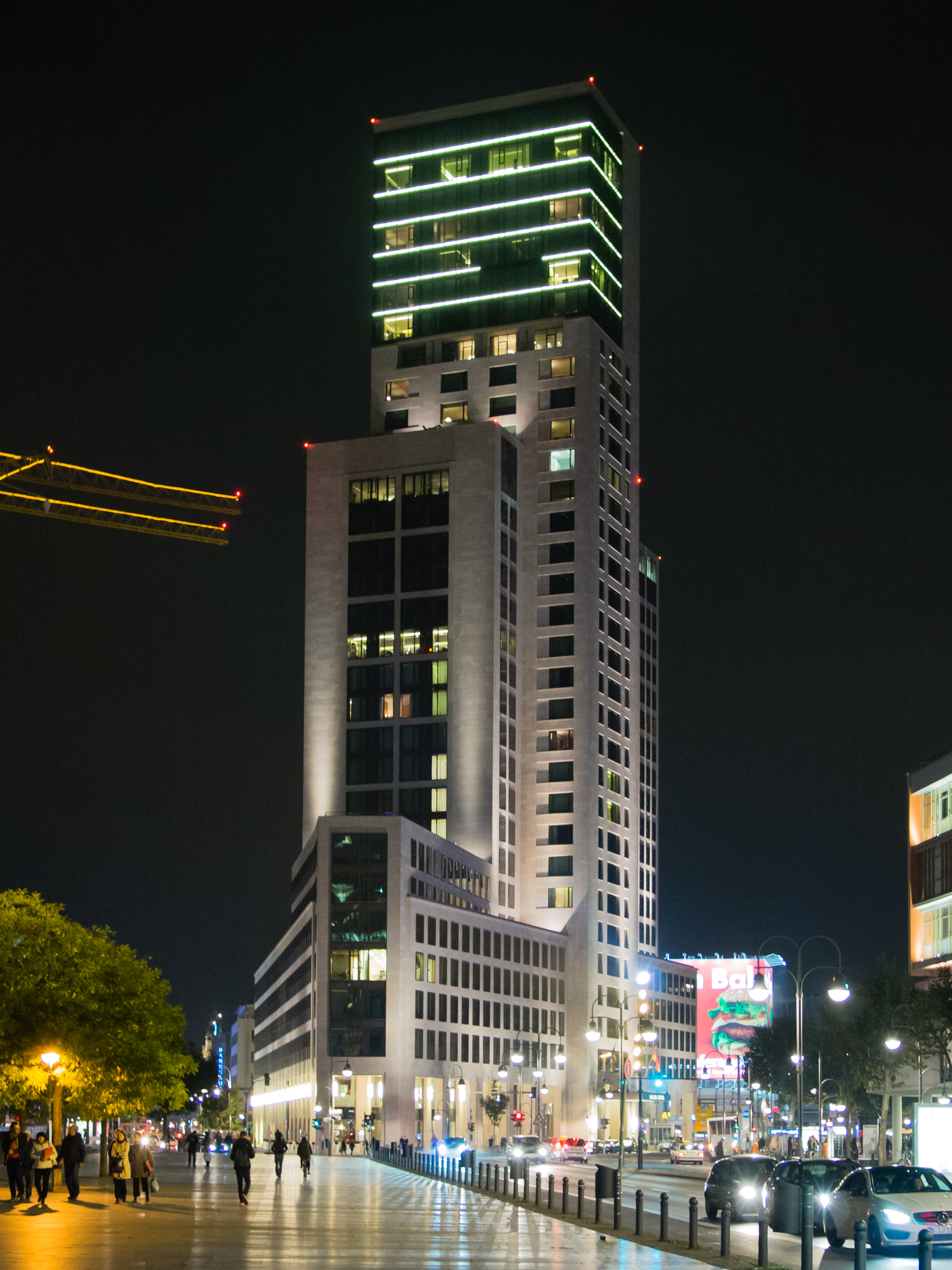
Zoofenster

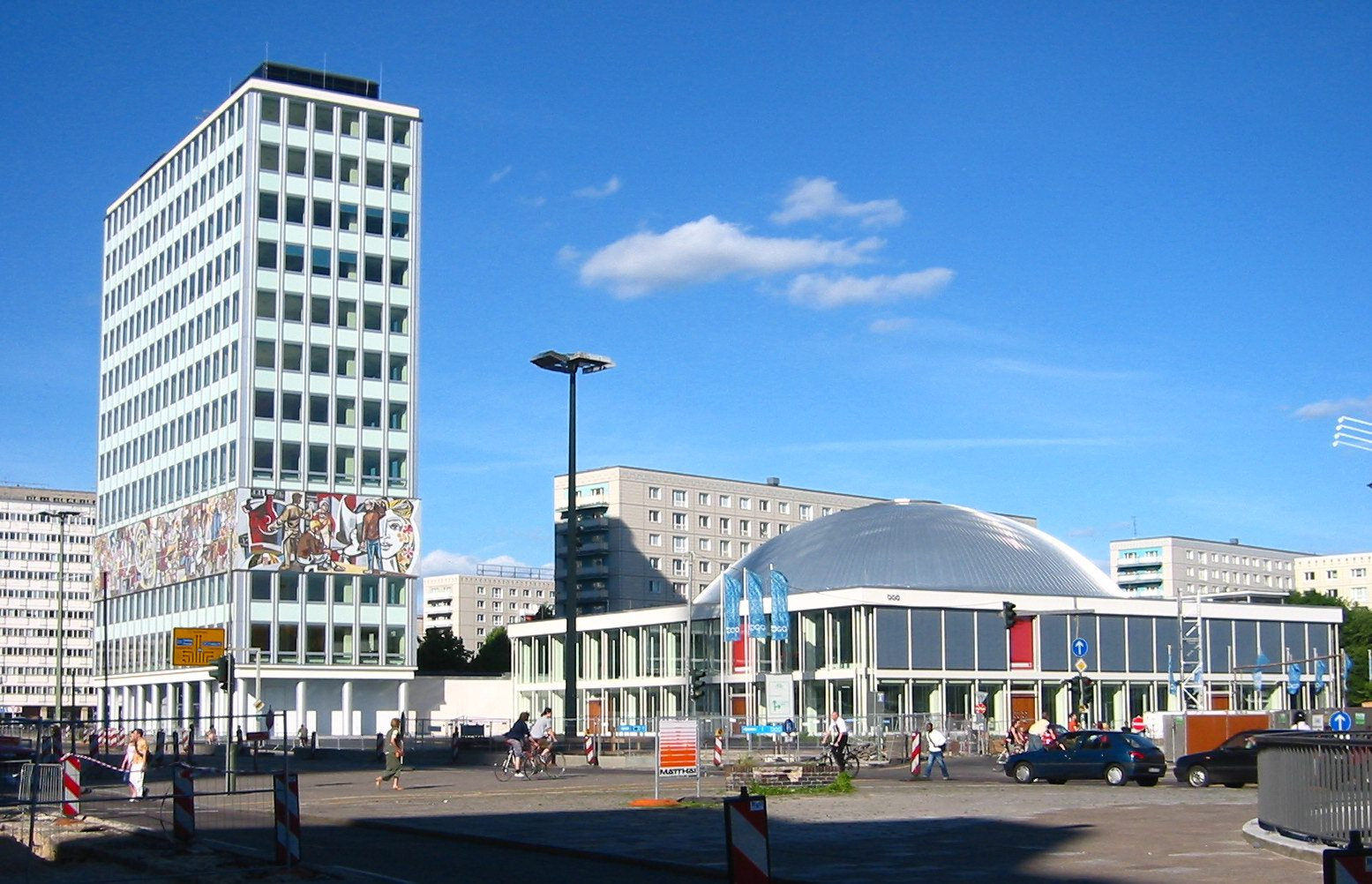
Haus des Lehrers

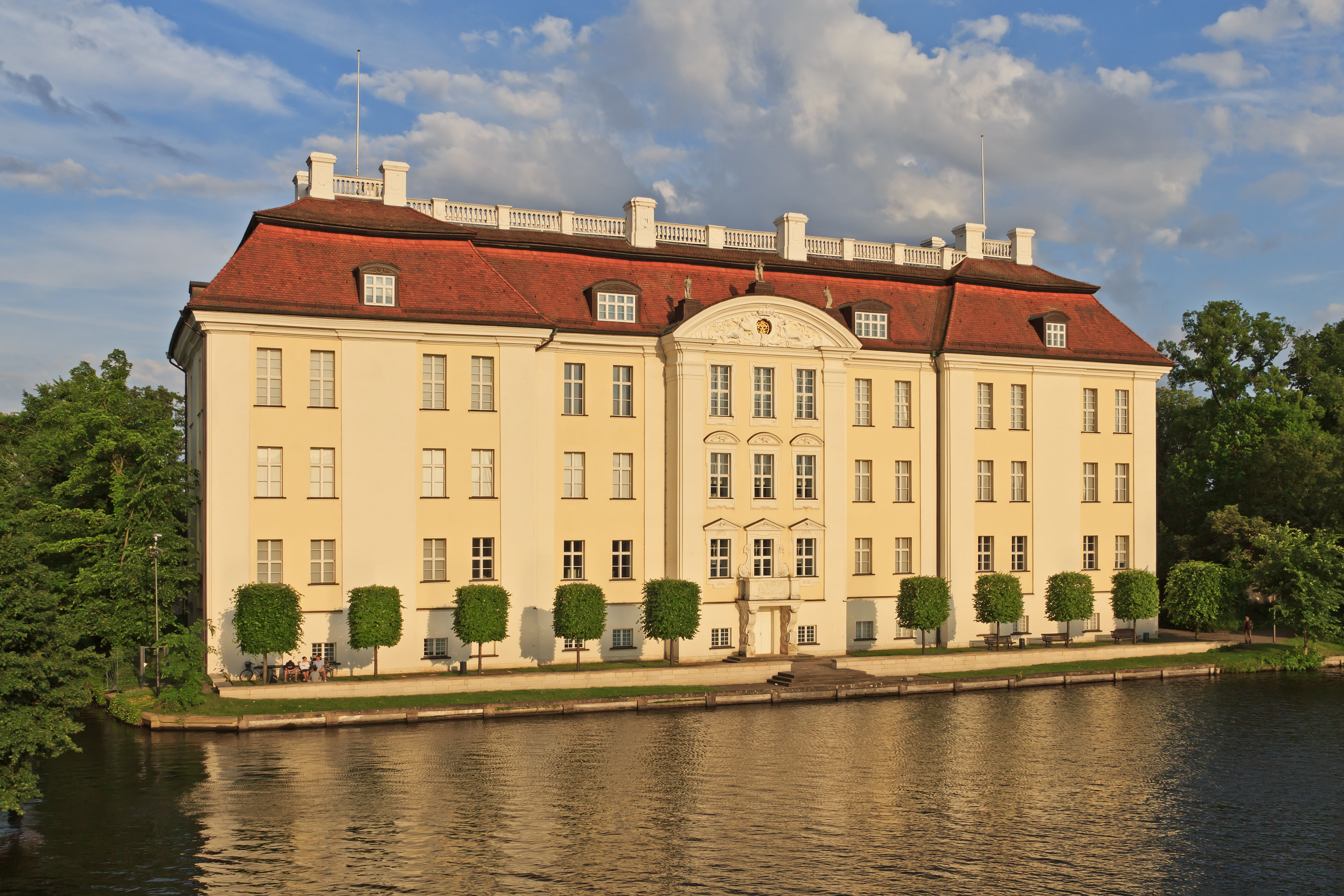
Köpenick Palace

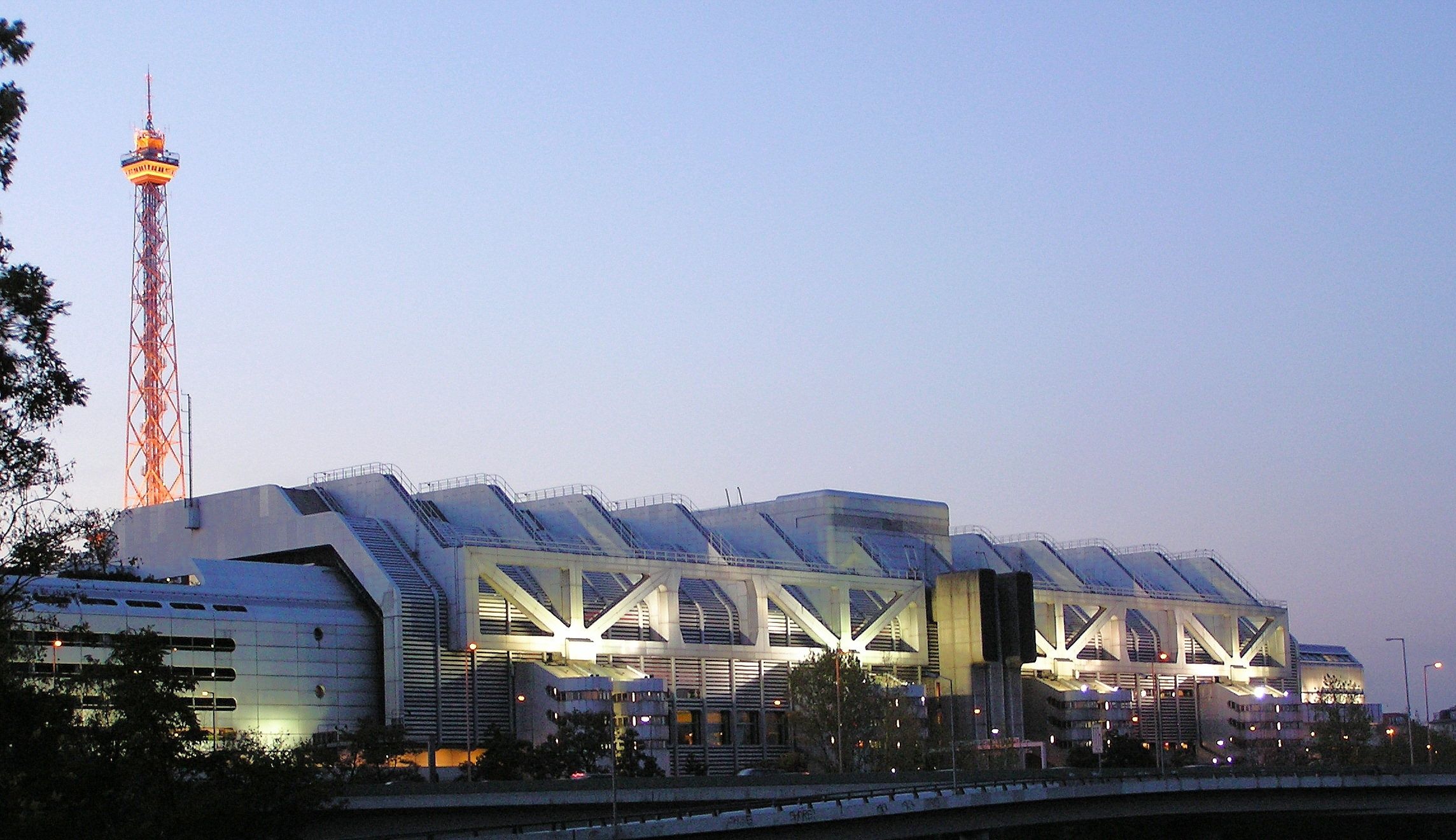
International Congress Centre (ICC) with radio tower

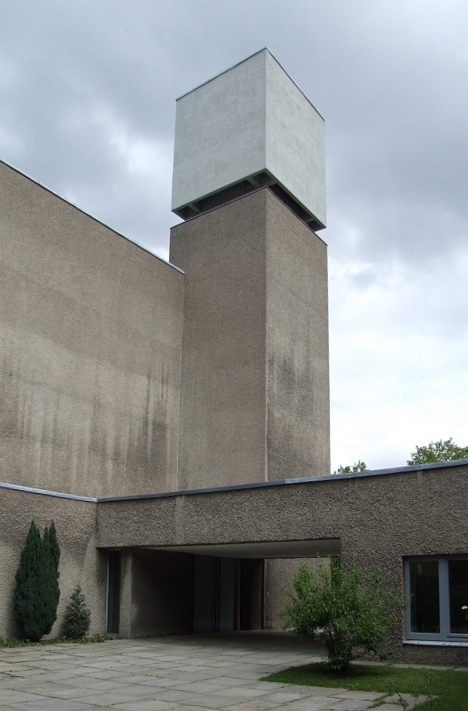
Former St. Agnes Church

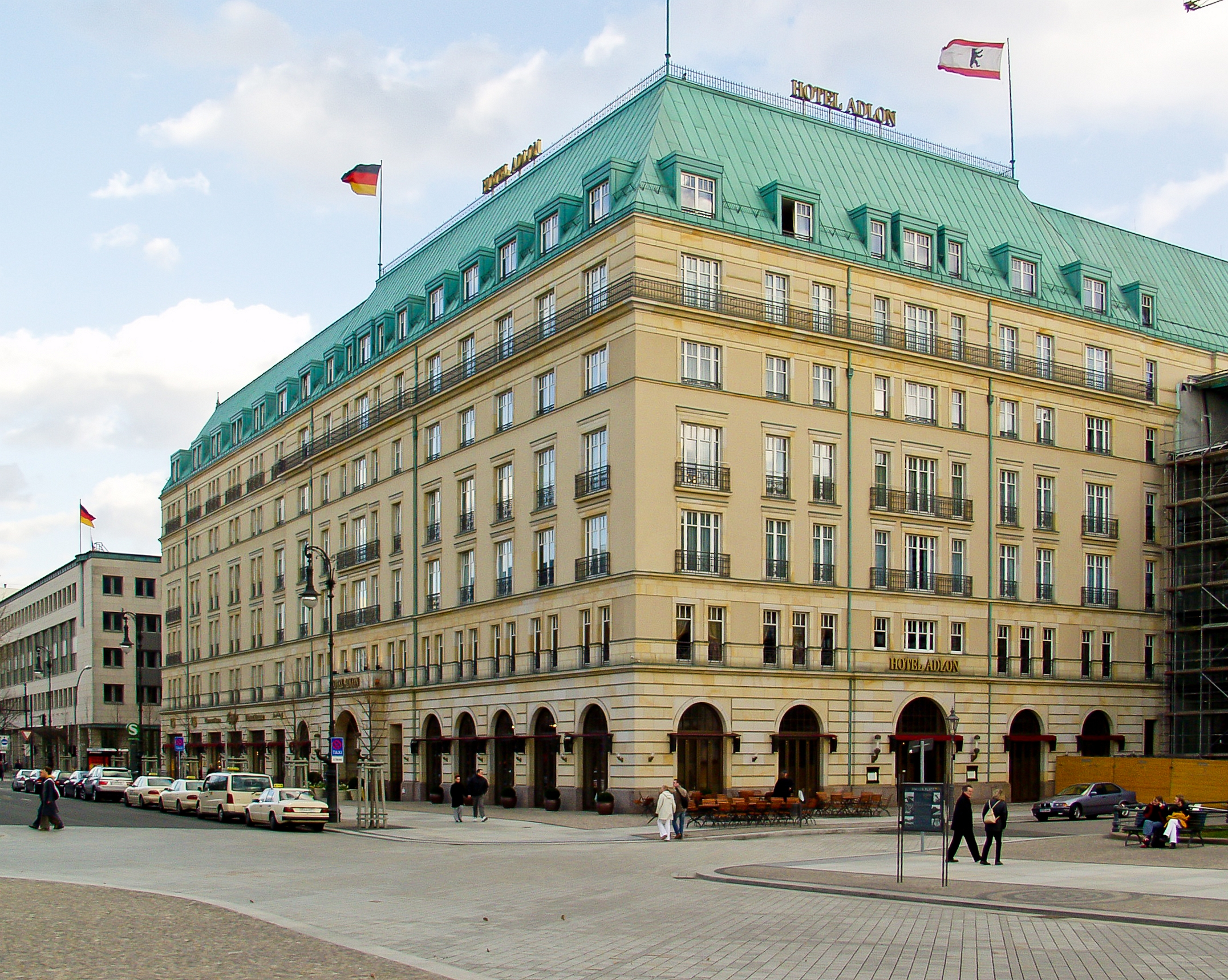
Hotel Adlon

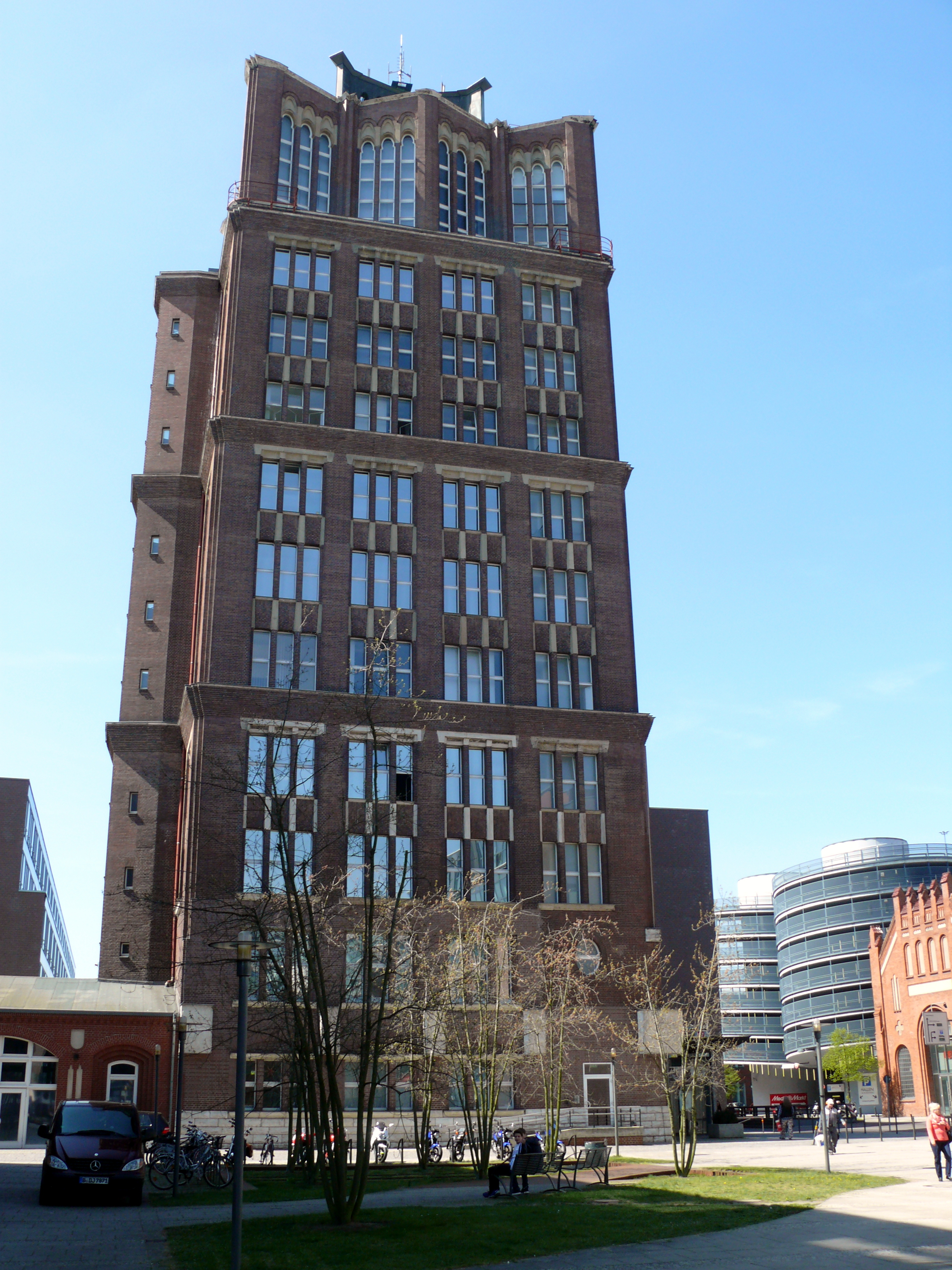
Borsigturm

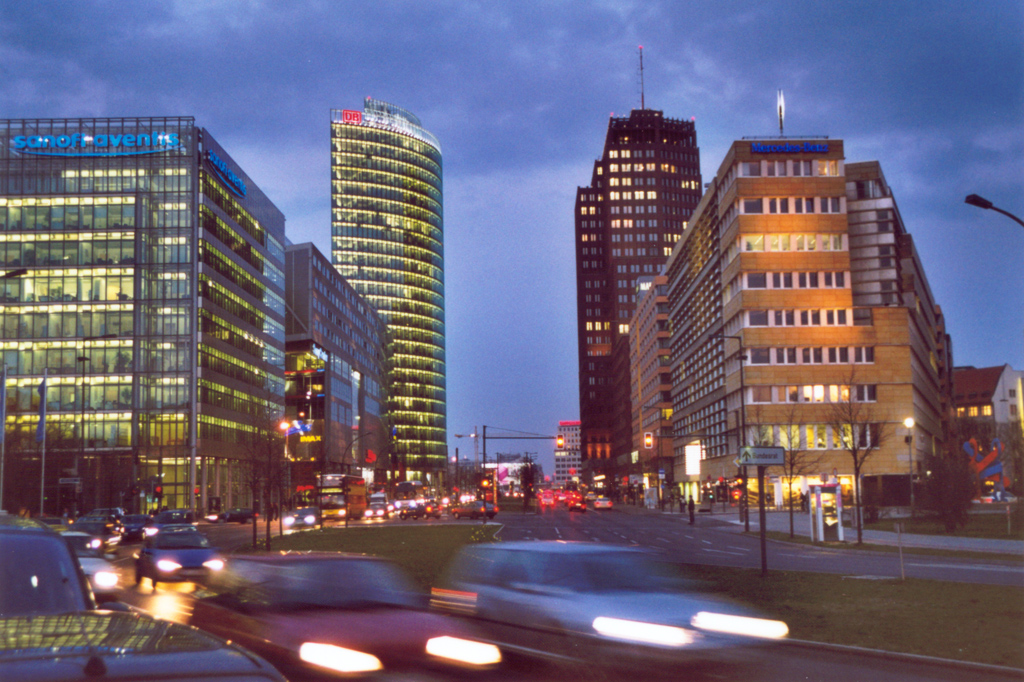
Potsdamer Platz

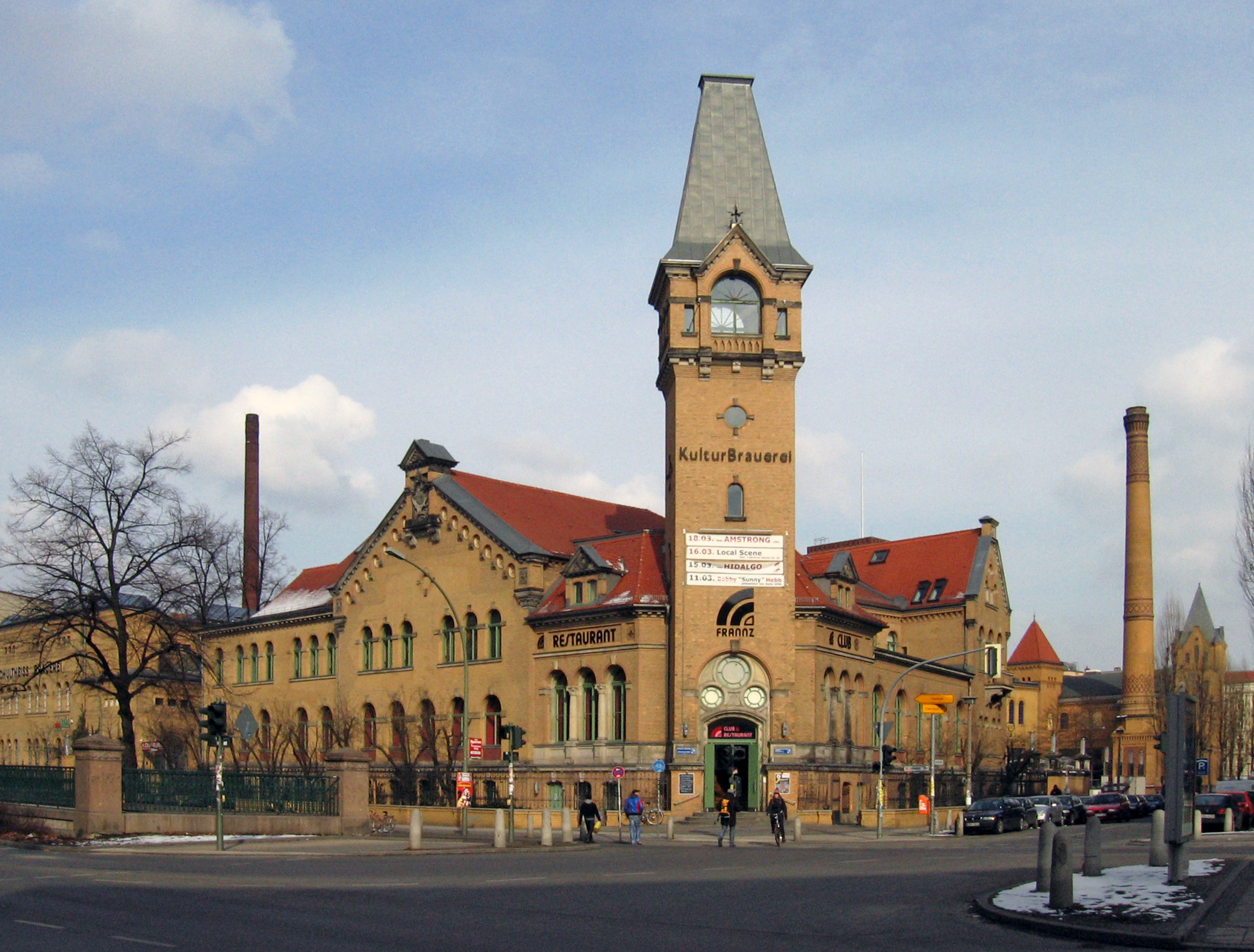
Kulturbrauerei

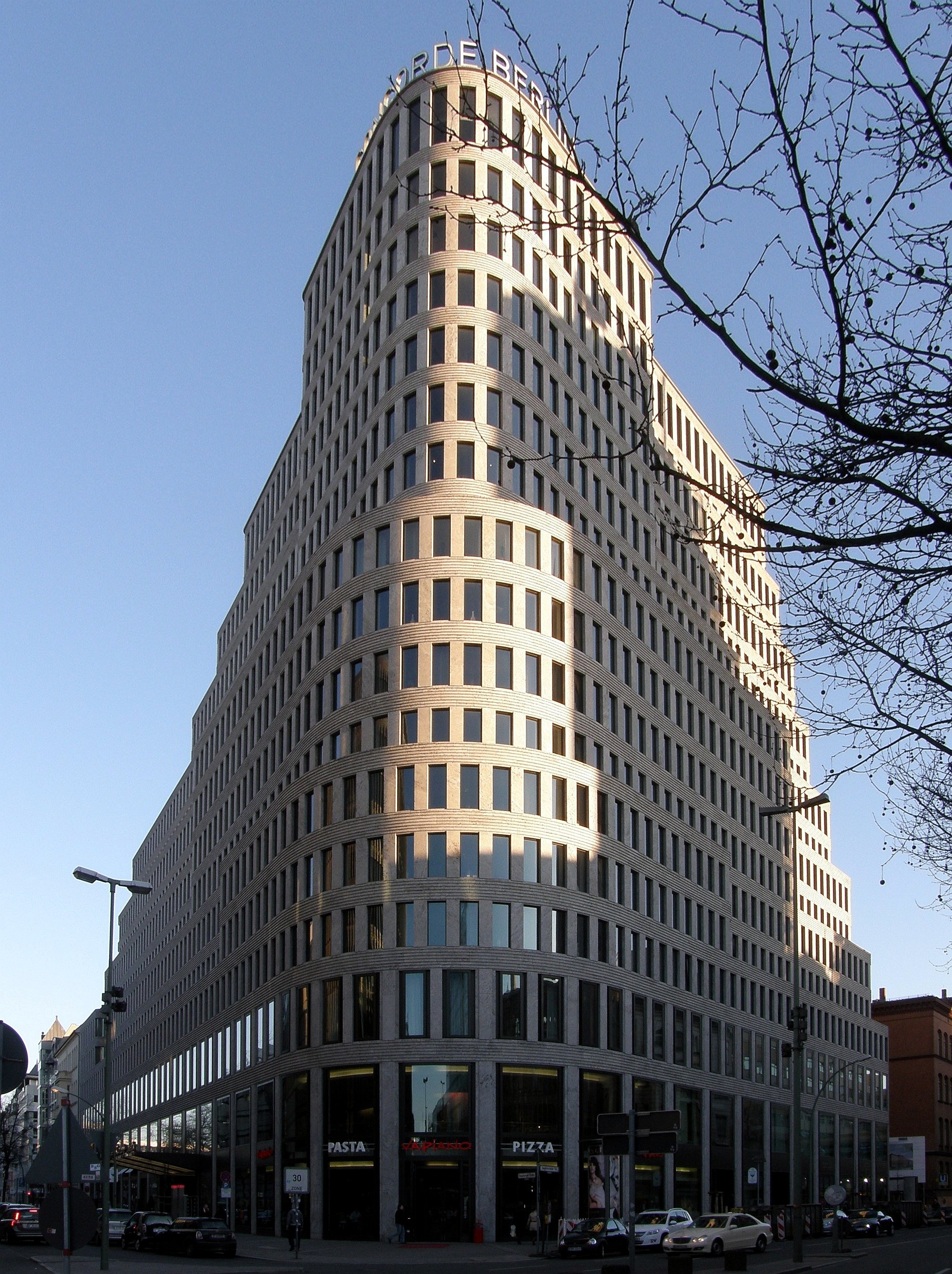
Hotel Concorde

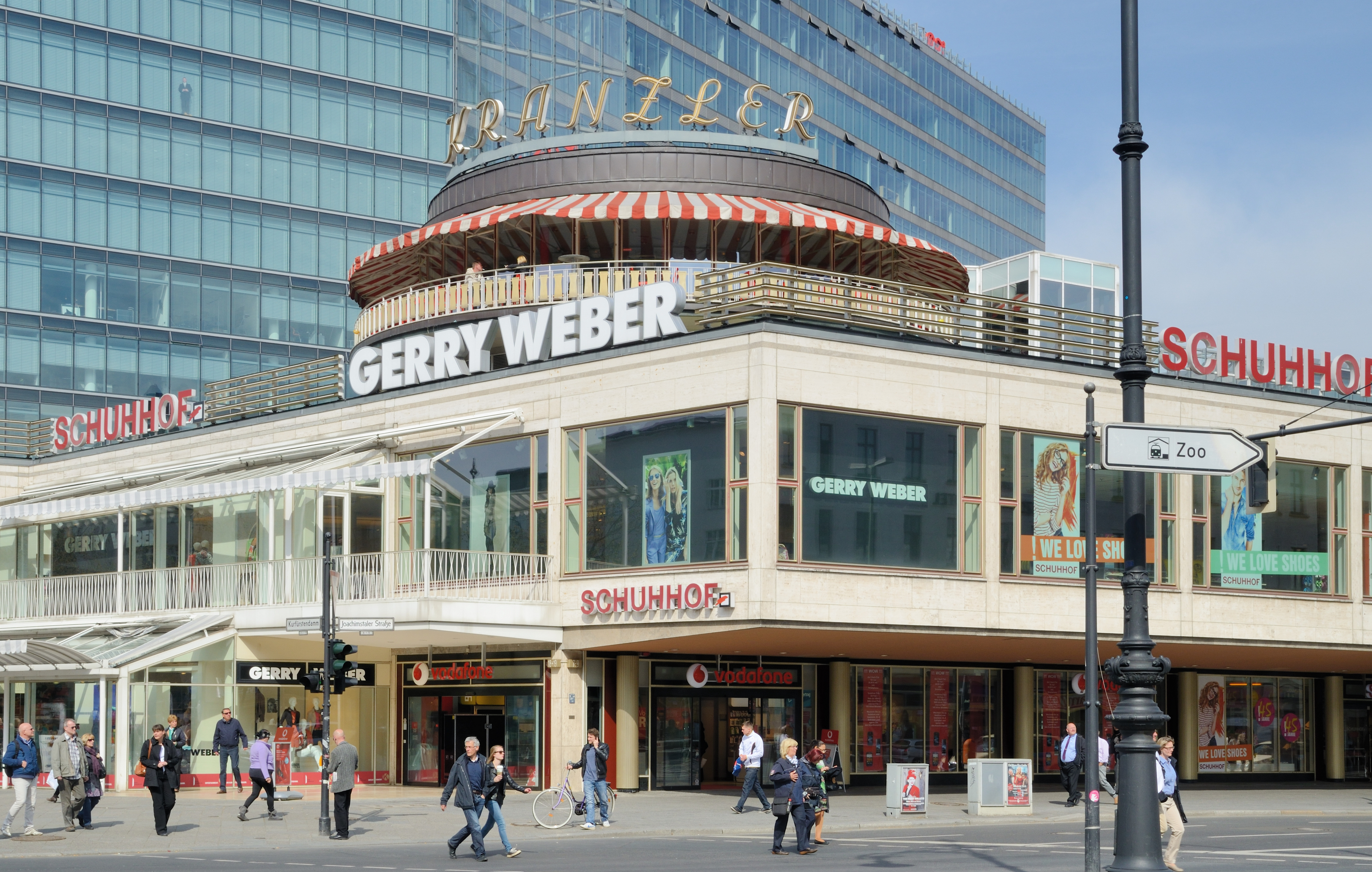
Kranzler Eck

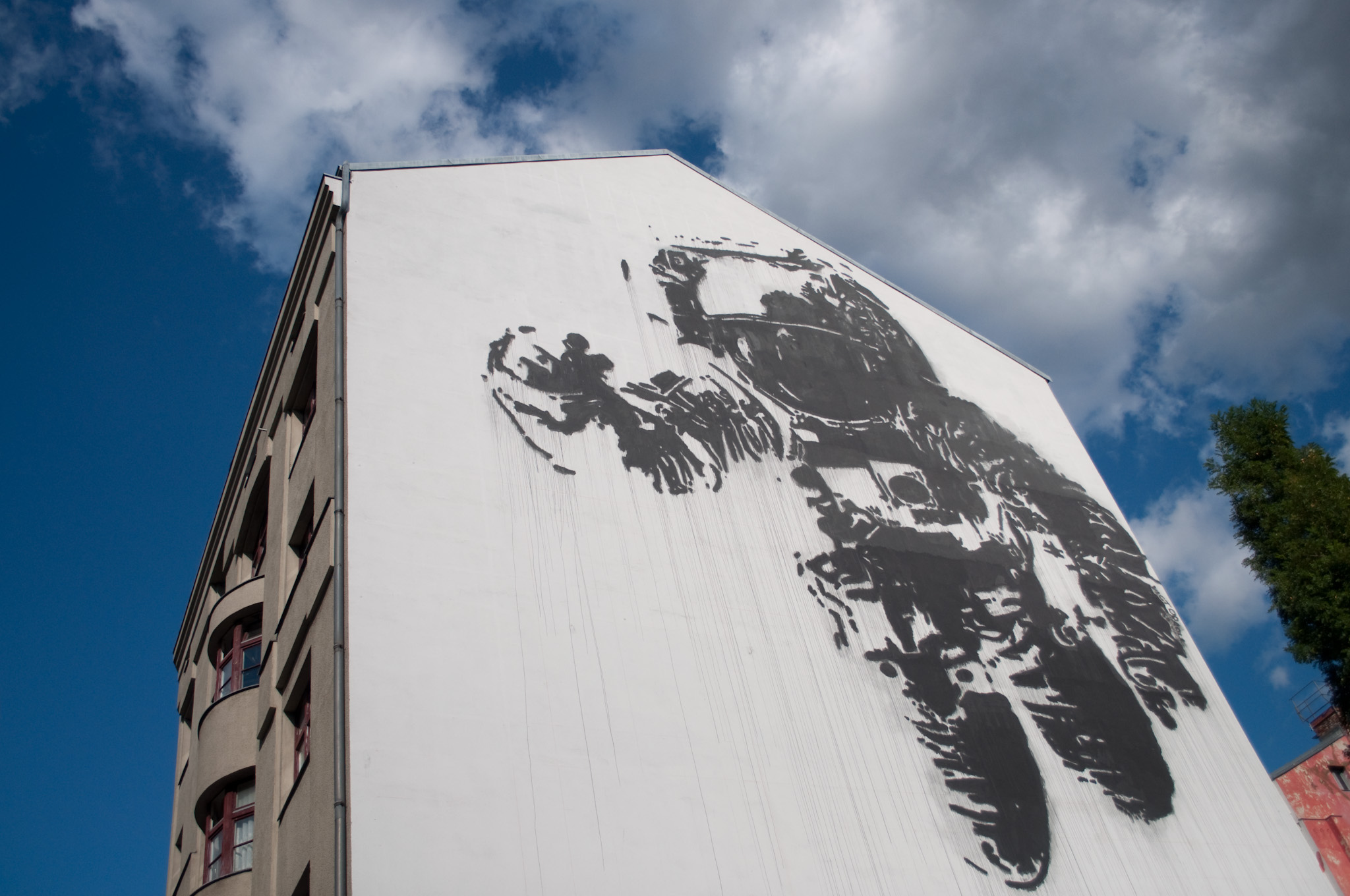
Cosmonaut Streetart in Kreuzberg

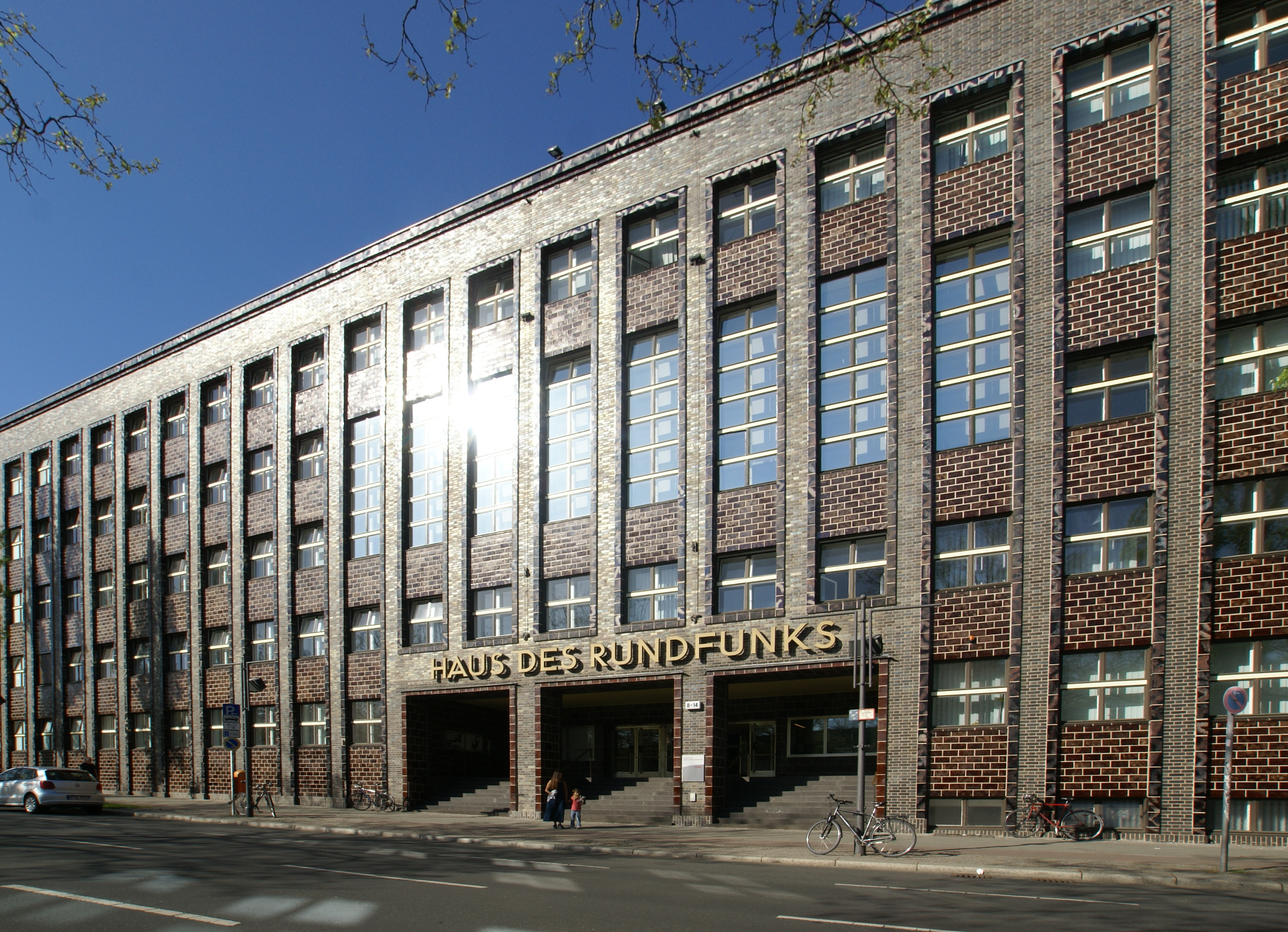
Haus des Rundfunks

== Happenings ==
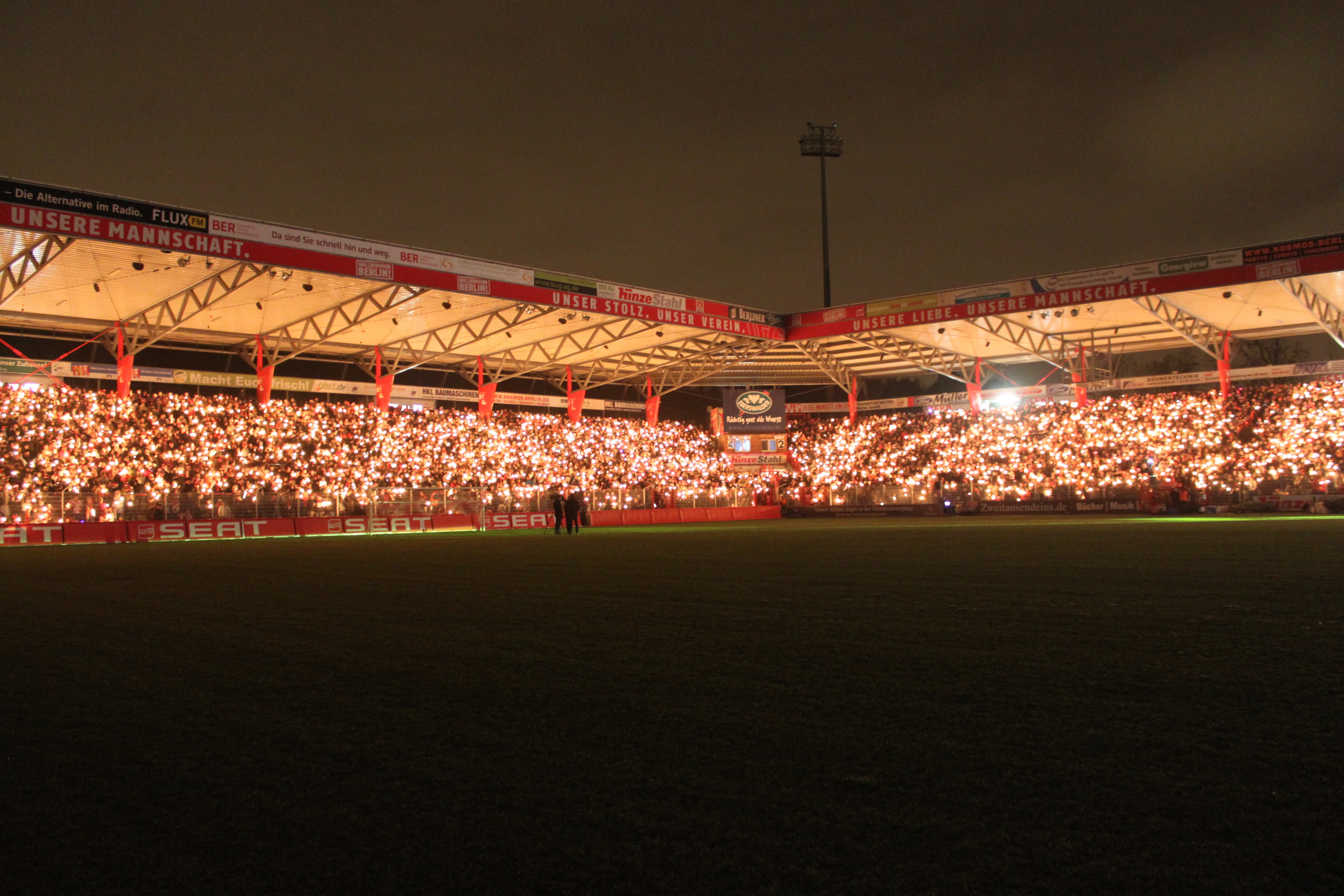
Christmas Carols (Union Berlin)

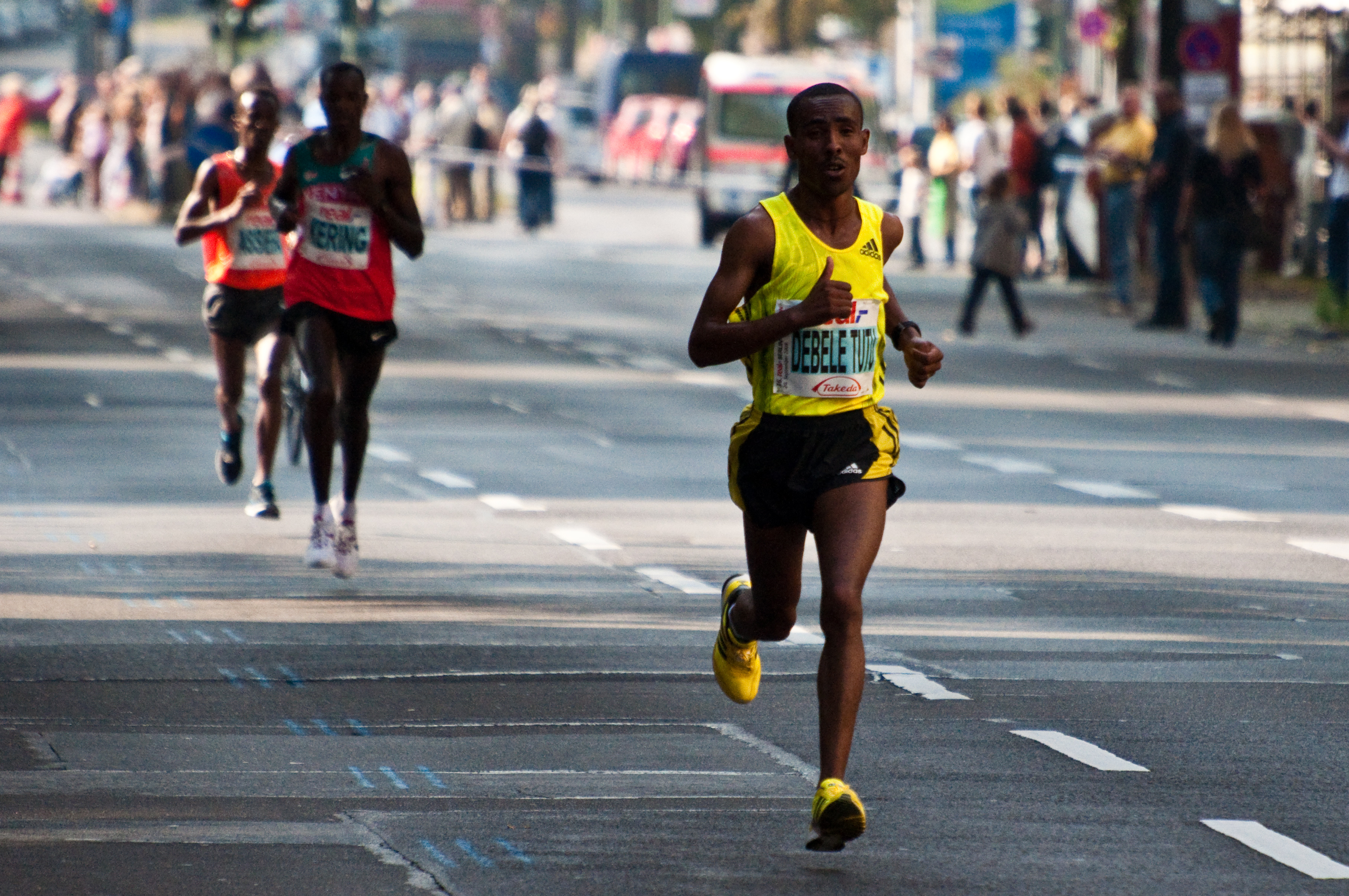
Berlin Marathon

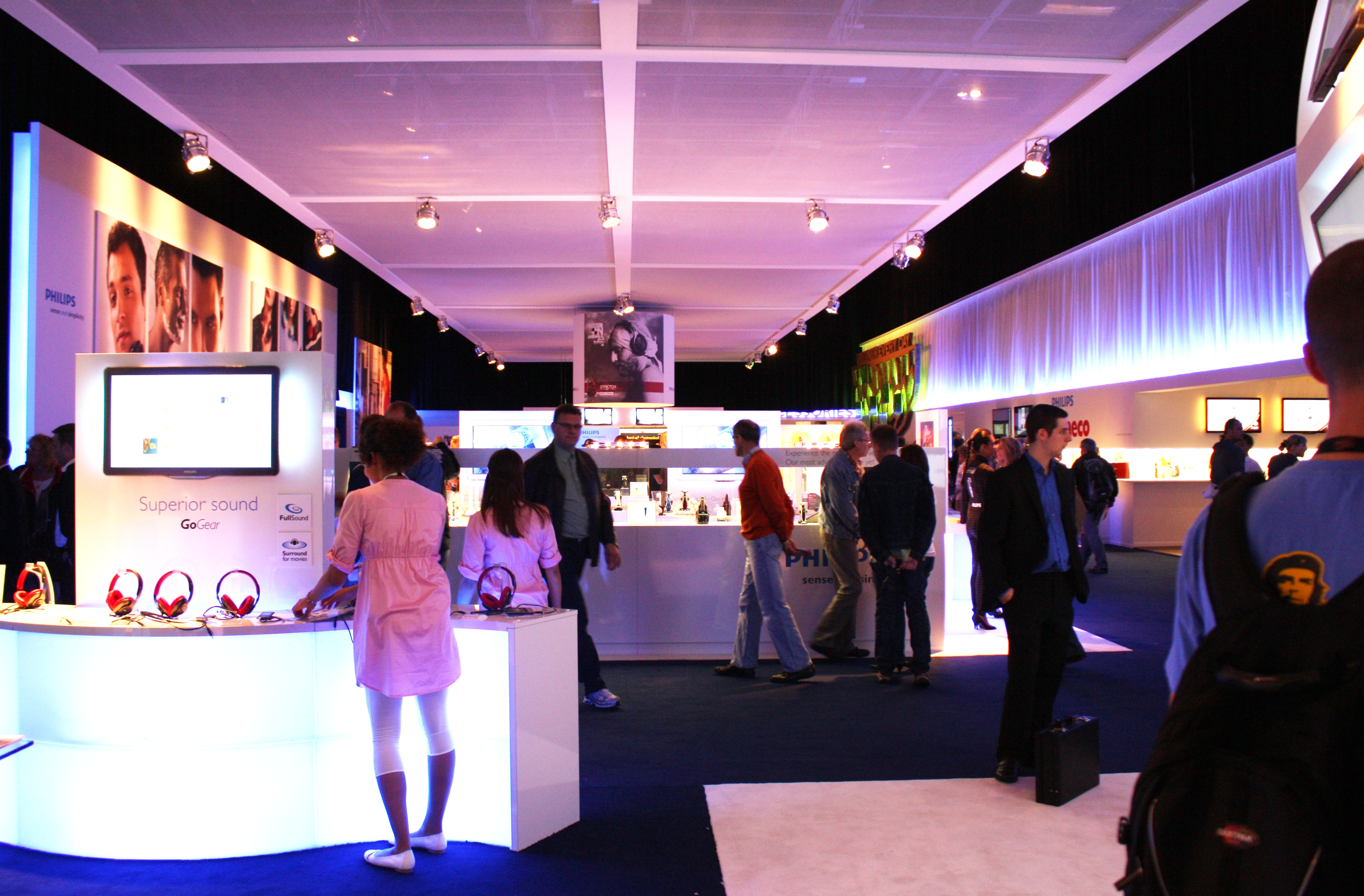
IFA

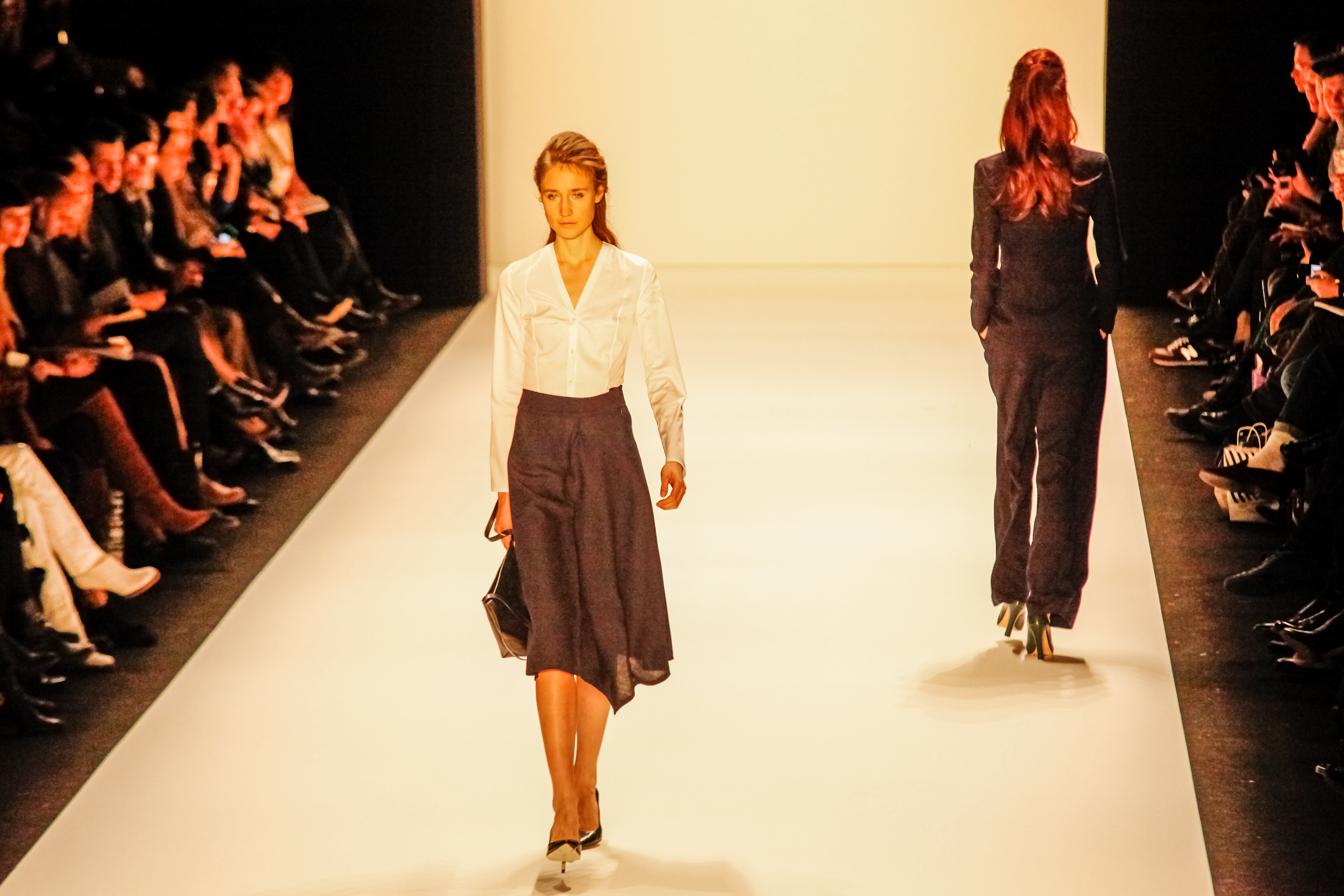
Berlin Fashion Week

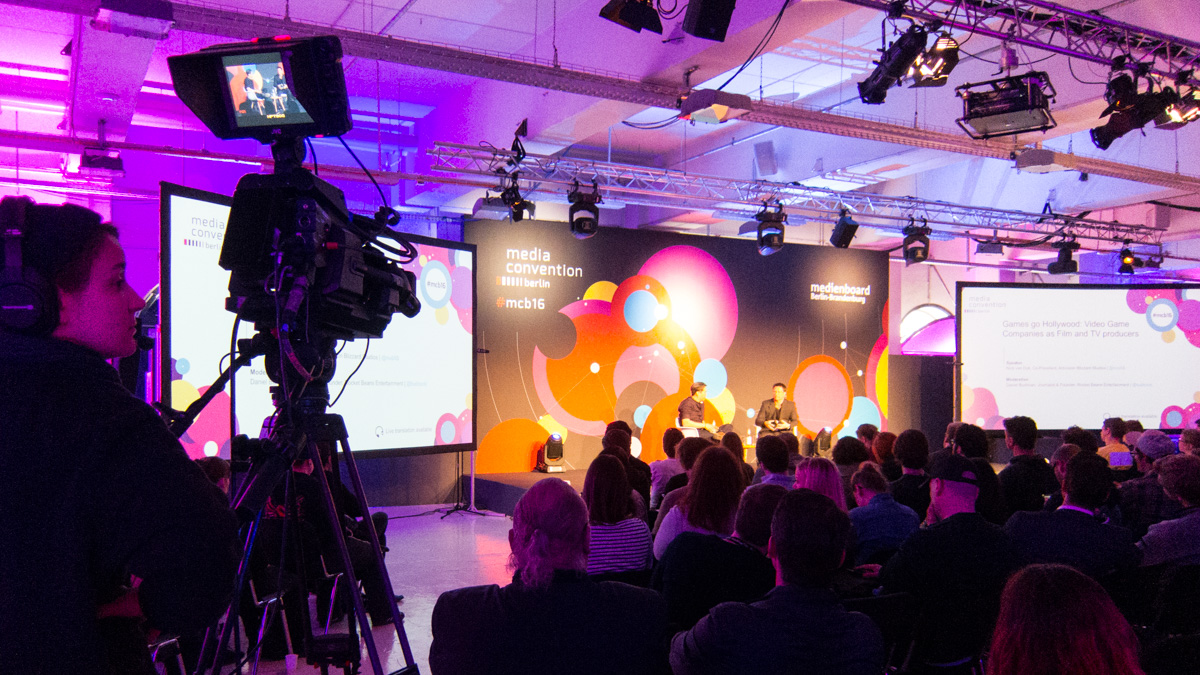
re:publica

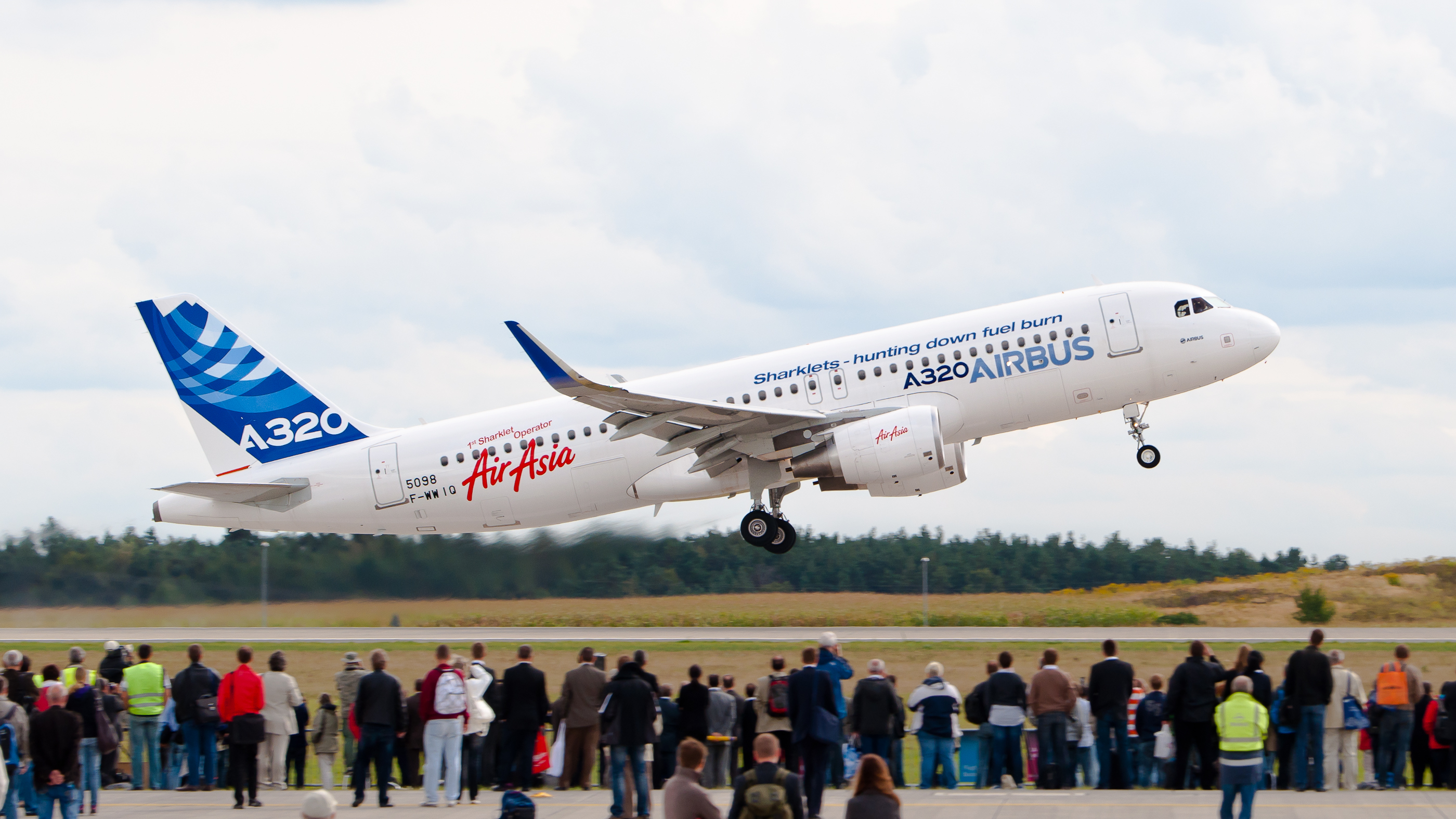
ILA Berlin Air Show

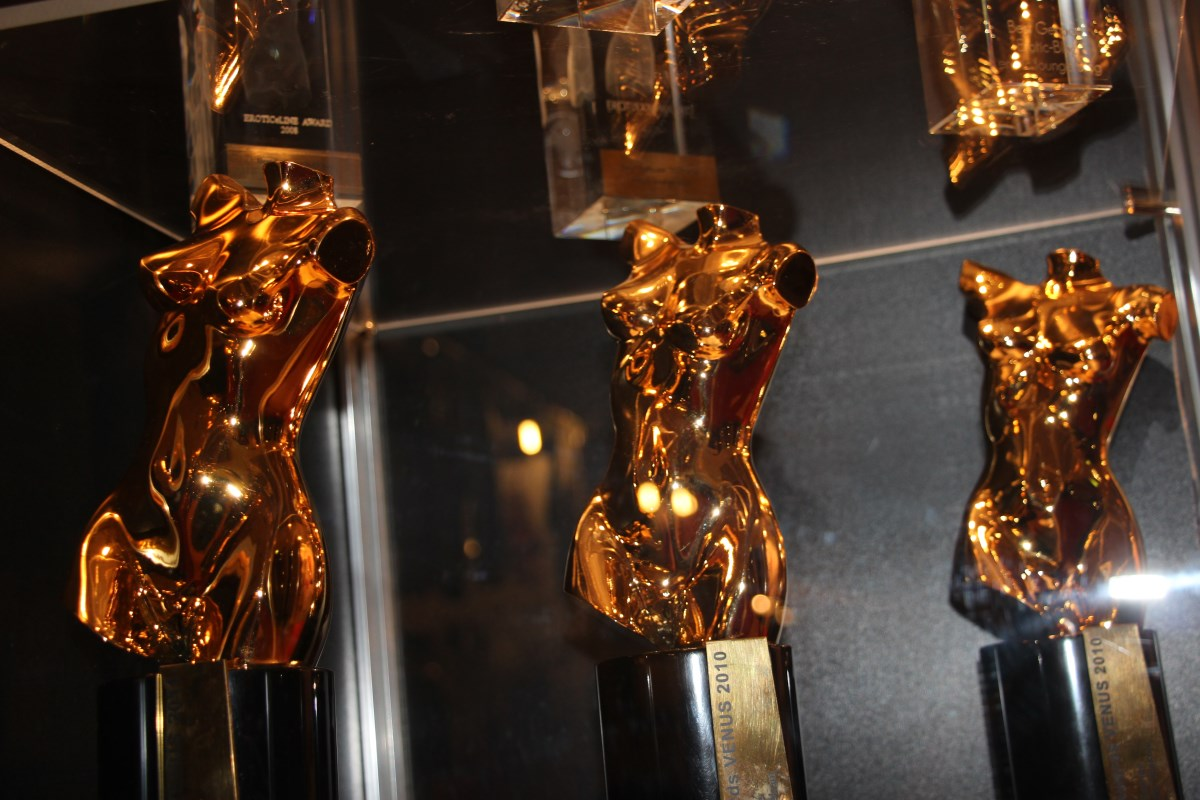
Venus Awards

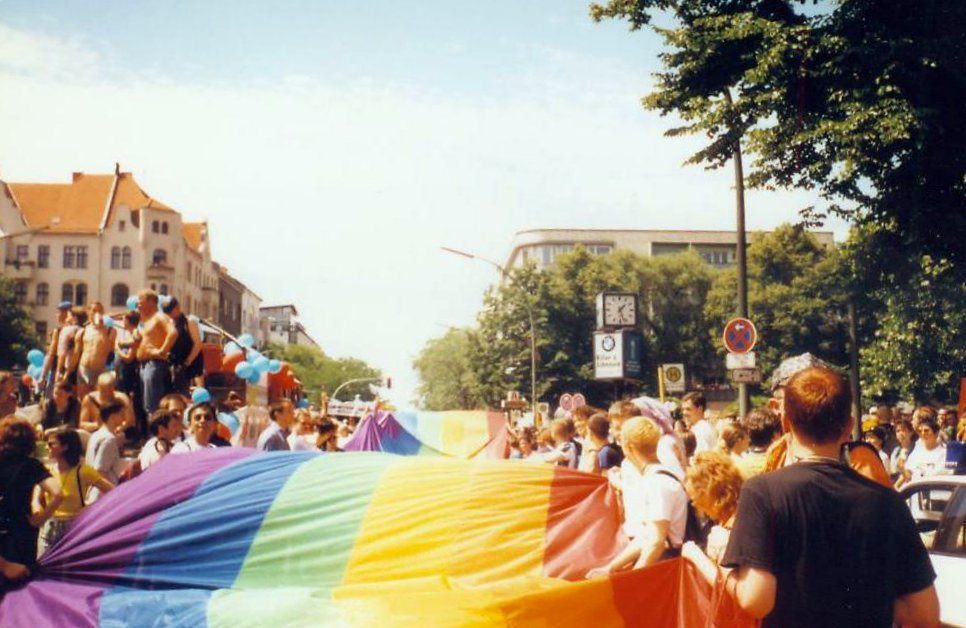
Christopher Street Day

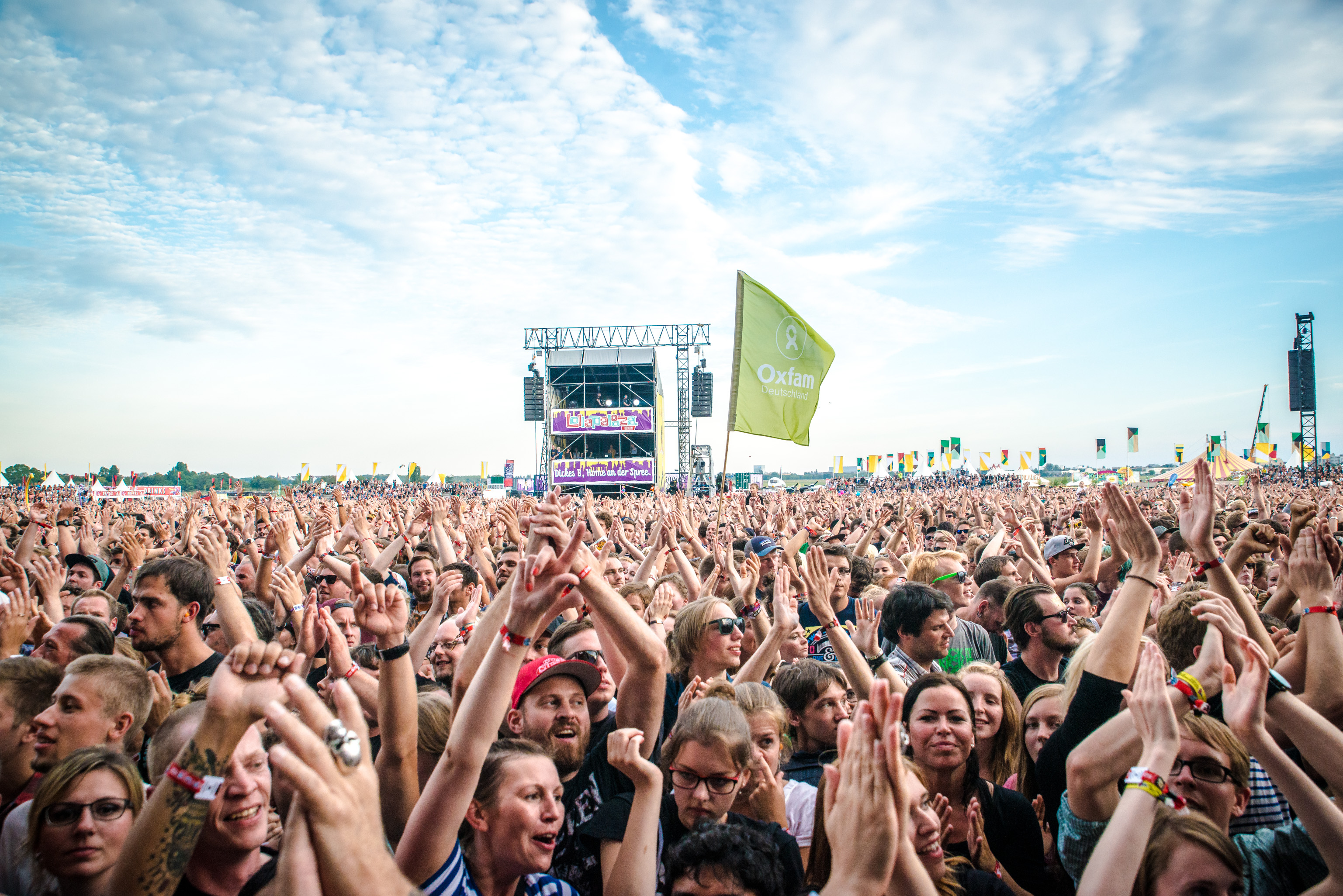
Lollapalooza

== See also ==
- St. Nicholas' Church
- St. Mary's Church
- Palaces and Parks of Potsdam and Berlin
- Historic cemeteries in Berlin
- Berlin Memorial Plaques
- Alte Kommandantur
- Berlin State Library
- The Kennedys Museum
- Akademie der Künste
- Remnants of the old city wall of Berlin-Cölln
- Philological Library - Free University of Berlin
