= German Centre for Integrative Biodiversity Research (iDiv) =

German research centre

The German Centre for Integrative Biodiversity Research (iDiv) Halle-Jena-Leipzig is a DFG research center with staff and members at its main locations in Halle, Jena and Leipzig. It is a central facility of Leipzig University, and is run together with the Martin Luther University Halle-Wittenberg and Friedrich Schiller University Jena, as well as in cooperation with the Helmholtz Centre for Environmental Research - UFZ. In addition, seven non-university research institutions belong to the iDiv consortium. iDiv was founded in 2012 and is funded by the DFG.

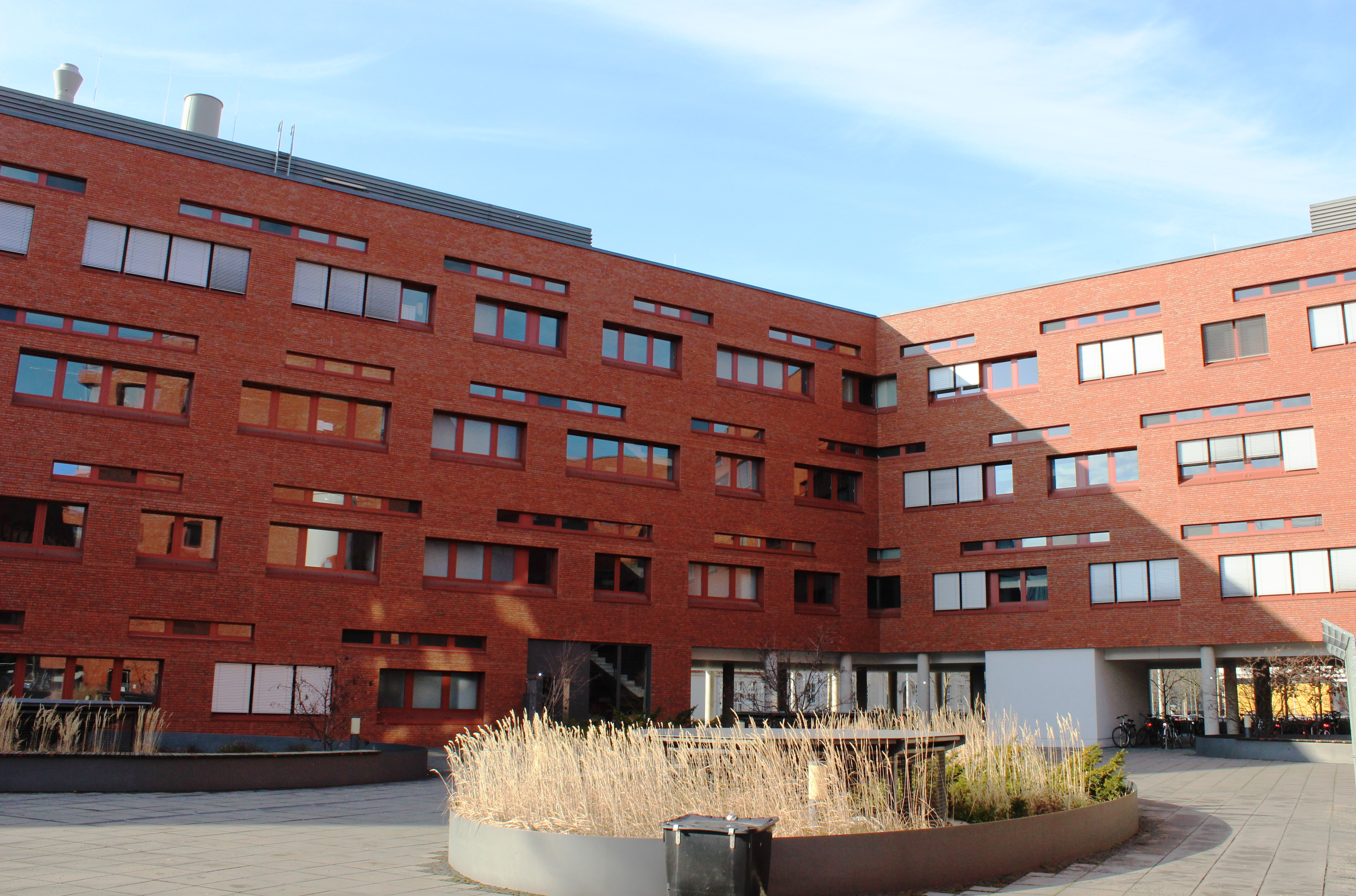
The German Centre for Integrative Biodiversity Research (iDiv) is based in Leipzig, Germany

== History ==
Due to a great need for research to facilitate implementation of the National Strategy on Biological Diversity, the DFG developed the idea of having its own collaborative research centre for biodiversity. Finally, an institution in the form of a DFG research centre was decided upon.

In the time leading up to October 2010, 15 universities applied to the DFG for establishment of the research centre. The concepts of the FU Berlin, the University of Göttingen, the University Network Halle-Jena-Leipzig and the University of Oldenburg were preselected in July 2011 by the DFG Senate. The FU Berlin and the University Network Halle-Jena-Leipzig were then shortlisted.

On April 27, 2012, came the decision in favour of the University Network Halle-Jena-Leipzig and for the establishment of the core centre at the Leipzig location. At its meeting in Bonn, the DFG's central committee selected the joint application of the Universities of Halle, Jena and Leipzig on the recommendation of the DFG Senate. The scientific and structural conditions at the three neighbouring locations are excellent, and the fact that they already had a strong reputation and had conducted numerous, in some instances internationally oriented research projects in the field of biodiversity science before the opening of the research centre influenced the DFG in its decision. In addition, eight non-university research institutions are involved in the new centre: the Helmholtz Centre for Environmental Research - UFZ, the Max Planck Institute for Biogeochemistry, the Max Planck Institute for Chemical Ecology, the Max Planck Institute for Evolutionary Anthropology, the Leibniz Institute DSMZ - German Collection of Microorganisms and Cell Cultures, the Leibniz Institute of Plant Biochemistry, the Leibniz Institute of Plant Genetics and Crop Plant Research and the Leibniz Institute Senckenberg Museum of Natural History Görlitz (SMNG).

In autumn 2012, the centre moved to the Biocity at Deutscher Platz 5 in the southeast of the city of Leipzig.

iDiv moved into a new building at the Alte Messe area in 2021.

== Financing ==
The DFG funds iDiv in the current, second funding period (2016-2020) with approximately 9 million euros annually. This represents an increase of 32 percent compared to the first funding period. In addition, the partners in the iDiv consortium make their own contributions and there are also third-party grants for individual research projects. The DFG usually funds DFG research centres such as iDiv for three four-year periods.

== Research ==
Biodiversity research at iDiv takes place against the backdrop of the current biodiversity crisis. The magnitude of it, the underlying processes and consequences for humanity are often unknown. In order to better understand the complex interactions, iDiv research prioritises synthesis, theory and transdisciplinarity. iDiv has two missions:

First, to provide a scientific basis for the sustainable use of our planet's biodiversity.

Second, to develop a new field of research: 'Integrative Biodiversity Research'

== Staff and structure ==
iDiv has four speakers, which are currently Christian Wirth (representing Leipzig University), Nicole van Dam (representing Friedrich Schiller University Jena), Henrique Miguel Pereira (representing Martin University Halle-Wittenberg) and Tiffany M. Knight (representing the Helmholtz Centre for Environmental Research – UFZ).

To date, nine full professors have been appointed:

• Experimental Interaction Ecology (Nico Eisenhauer)

• Biodiversity Conservation (Henrique Miguel Pereira)

• Ecosystem Services (Aletta Bonn)

• Molecular Interaction Ecology (Nicole van Dam)

• Physiological Diversity (Stanley Harpole)

• Biodiversity Synthesis (Jonathan Chase)

• Theory in Biodiversity Sciences (Ulrich Brose)

• Spatial Interaction Ecology (Tiffany M. Knight)

In addition, there are several other units operating at iDiv: In the sDiv Synthesis Centre, scientists from all over the world come together in so-called working groups in order to gain new insight from existing knowledge and data. The aim of the graduate school, yDiv (Young BioDiversity Research Training Group) is to train a new generation of interdisciplinary biodiversity scientists. Scientific coordination promotes integration among the working groups and iDiv members who are located throughout Central Germany. IT Support, Bioinformatics (BIU) and Biodiversity Informatics (BDU) ensure the storage, provision and analysis of data. The administration team takes care of purchasing, finance, human resources and infrastructure. The Department of Media and Communication promotes dialogue with politics and society.
