= Strasse des 18. Oktober =

Street in Leipzig, Germany

Coordinates: 51.324251°N 12.391147°E

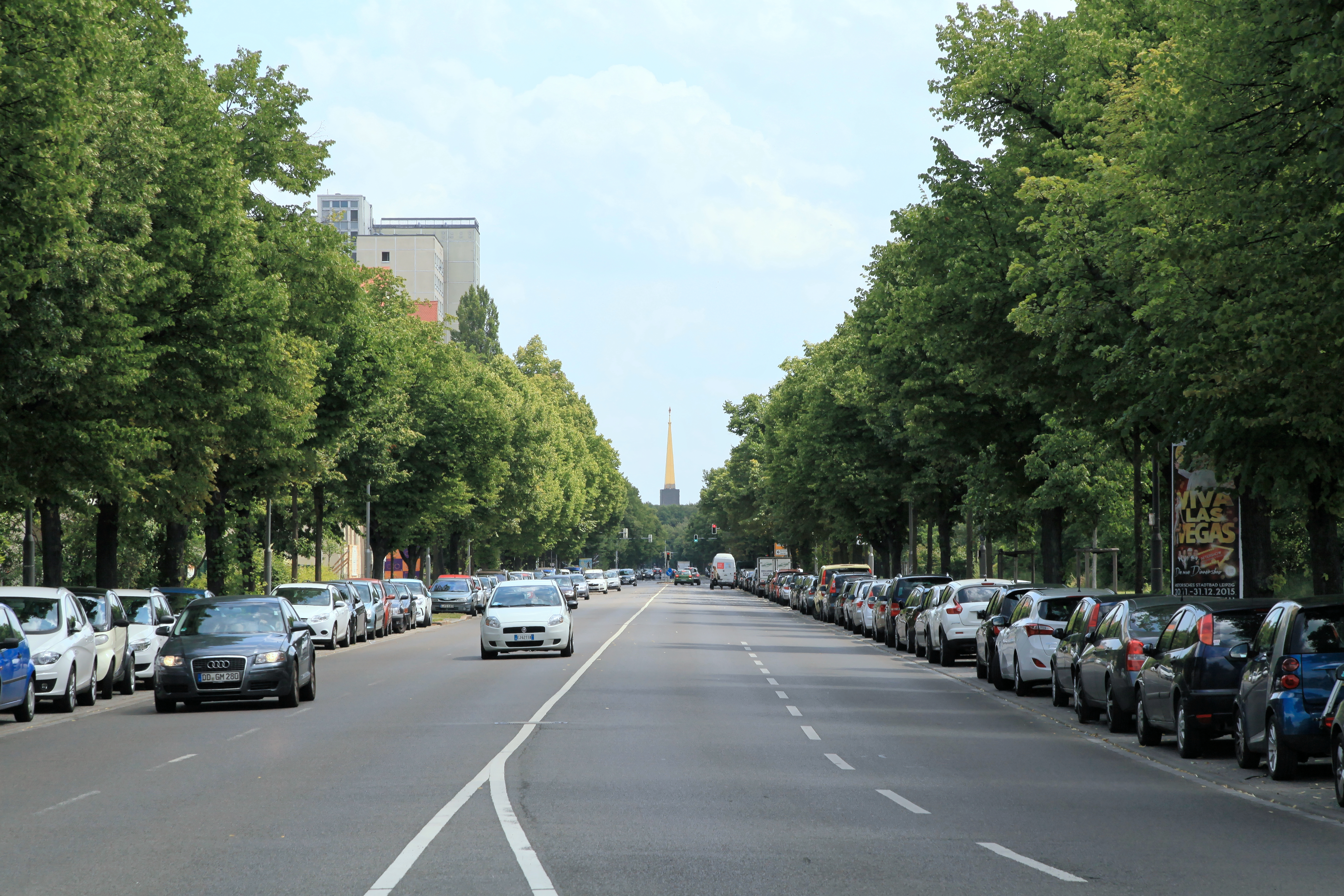
- View towards southeast (2015)
- Interactive map of Strasse des 18. Oktober
- Length: 2,600 m (8,500 ft)
- Width: 90 metres (295.3 ft)
- Location: Leipzig, Germany
- Postal code: 04103
- Major junctions: Johannisallee, Semmelweisstrasse
- North: Windmühlenstrasse
- South: An der Tabaksmühle

Construction
- Construction start: 1909

The Strasse des 18. Oktober, or Straße des 18. Oktober (see ß) (in English: Street of 18th October) in Leipzig, Germany, leads as a continuation of Windmühlenstrasse from the square in front of Bayerischer Bahnhof (Bayrischer Platz) in a south-easterly direction towards the Monument to the Battle of the Nations. Its name commemorates the day of the decisive victory of the allied troops over Napoleon in the Battle of Leipzig on 18 October 1813.

== Course and development ==
From Bayrischer Platz to Semmelweisstrasse, the Strasse des 18. Oktober runs in four lanes, with cycle paths and footpaths on both sides, which are separated from the roadway by a row of lime trees. On the northeast side, a high-rise of the PH 16 type is followed by three buildings from 1915 in closed development up to the corner of Johannisallee, according to which the building line on this side of the street is aligned. An eight-storey building over 290 metres (951.4 ft) long consisting of eleven offset parts contains student apartments. It is bordered by two other high-rise buildings.

The buildings on the south-western side are more than 50 metres (164.0 ft) from the street behind meadows, trees and parking spaces. There are eight eleven-storey prefabricated residential buildings of type P2, which are connected by access roads. Its series is interrupted by a high-rise tower and a shopping facility and was completed by a building of a data center that was no longer in operation until its demolition in 2022. A new residential high-rise is to be built here in the future.

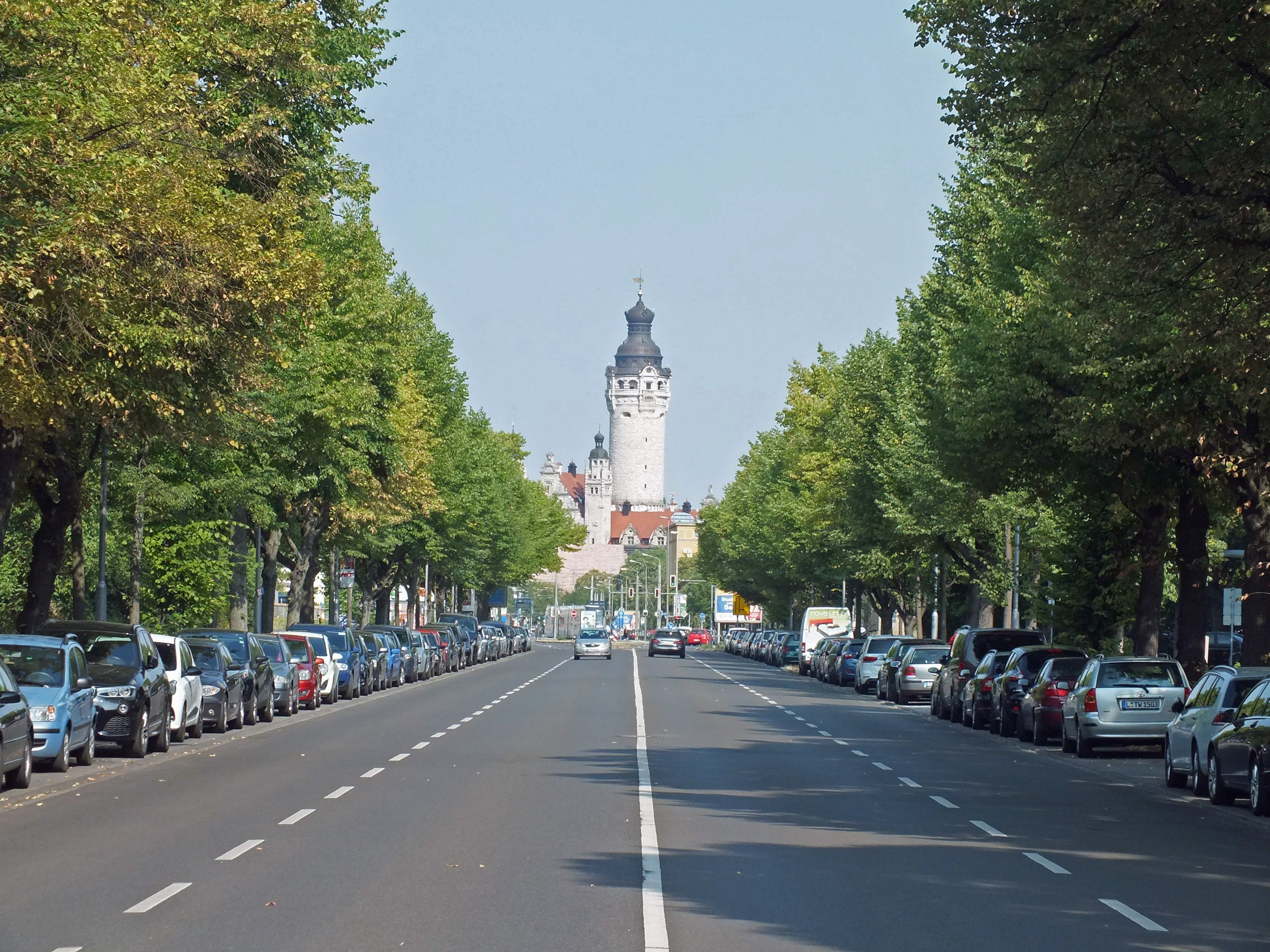
To the northwest with the tower of the New Town Hall

Shortly before Semmelweisstrasse, the road makes a slight bend of 5 degrees to the left. According to older ideas, the Monument to the Battle of the Nations and the tower of the New Town Hall should be visible at the ends of the streets if possible. But that could not be realized. So you can see the town hall tower on one side as far as Semmelweisstrasse and the tower of the former Soviet exhibition hall with the red star on the other, and only after the bend the Monument to the Battle of the Nations.

100 metres (328.1 ft) after Semmelweisstrasse, the street splits and forms the Deutscher Platz, where the Deutsche Bücherei (now: German National Library), with its 2011 extension, and the Max Planck Institute for Evolutionary Anthropology face each other.

The entrance to the Alte Messe (Old Exhibition Grounds) is built over and only used on two lanes. Of the two carriageways on the Strasse des 18. Oktober in the exhibition grounds, which are 50 metres (164.0 ft) apart, only the one following the entrance is still used for motor traffic. The other is reserved for bicycles and is also partly built-up. On the road, there are converted trade fair exhibition halls and an administration building of the Deutsche Bundesbank, built in the 1990s. Another resident is Bio City Leipzig.

The continuation of the Strasse des 18. Oktober in Wilhelm-Külz-Park to the street An der Tabaksmühle in front of the Monument to the Battle of the Nations initially leads as a bridge over the S-Bahn line and the long-distance tracks of the Deutsche Bahn. This bridge was rebuilt from 2019 to 2021, after the first construction from 1912 had to be demolished in 2016. The new bridge is 18.13 metres (59.5 ft) wide and open to pedestrians and cyclists, commemorating the Battle of Nations in 1813.

Due to the construction of Zwickauer Strasse (resolution for the development plan passed by the city council on 16 August 1995, completion of the street in 2000) as a new radial in a south-easterly direction, there is only access traffic on the southern part of the Strasse des 18. Oktober.

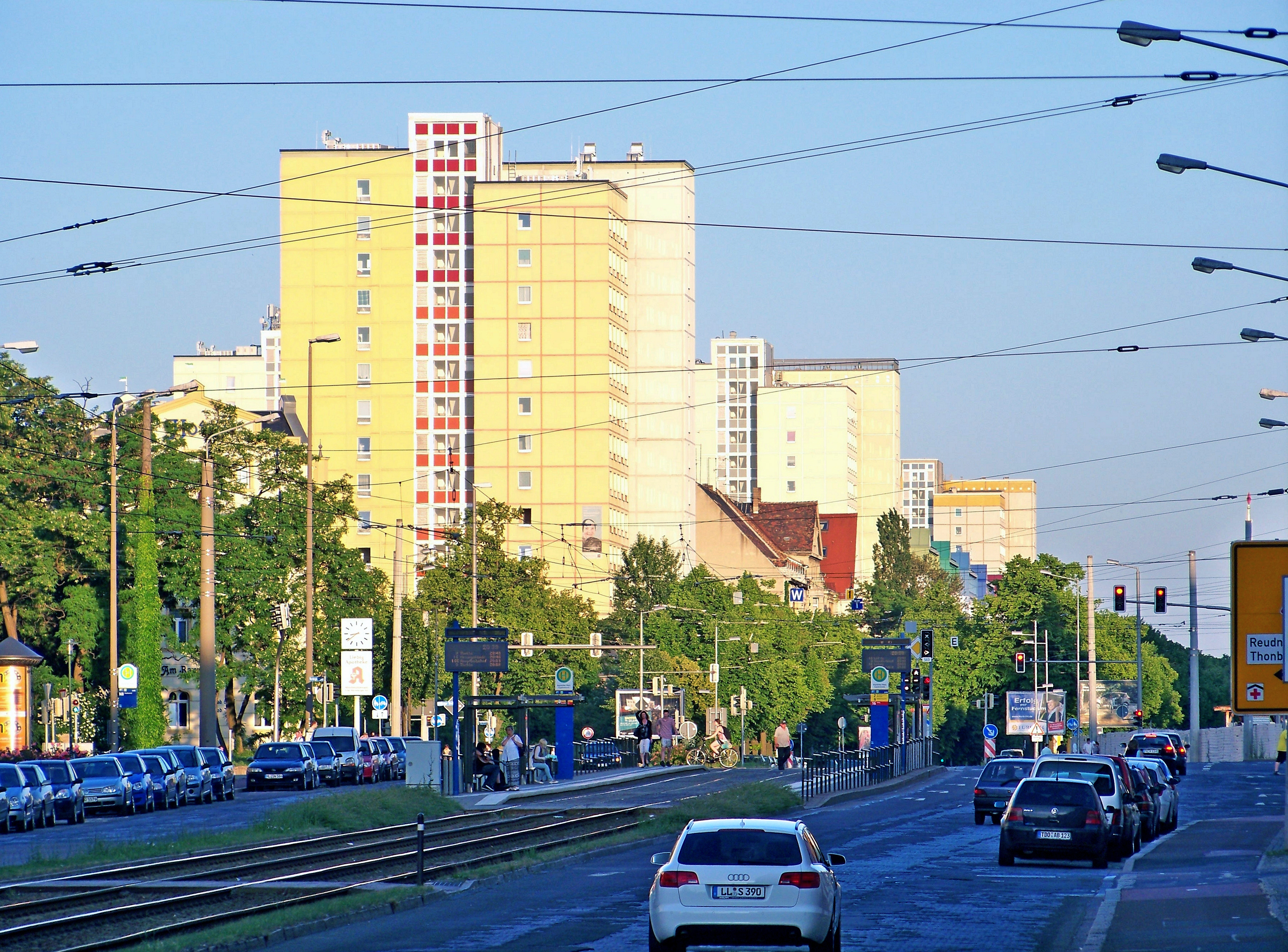
The beginning of the street at the Bayerischer Bahnhof

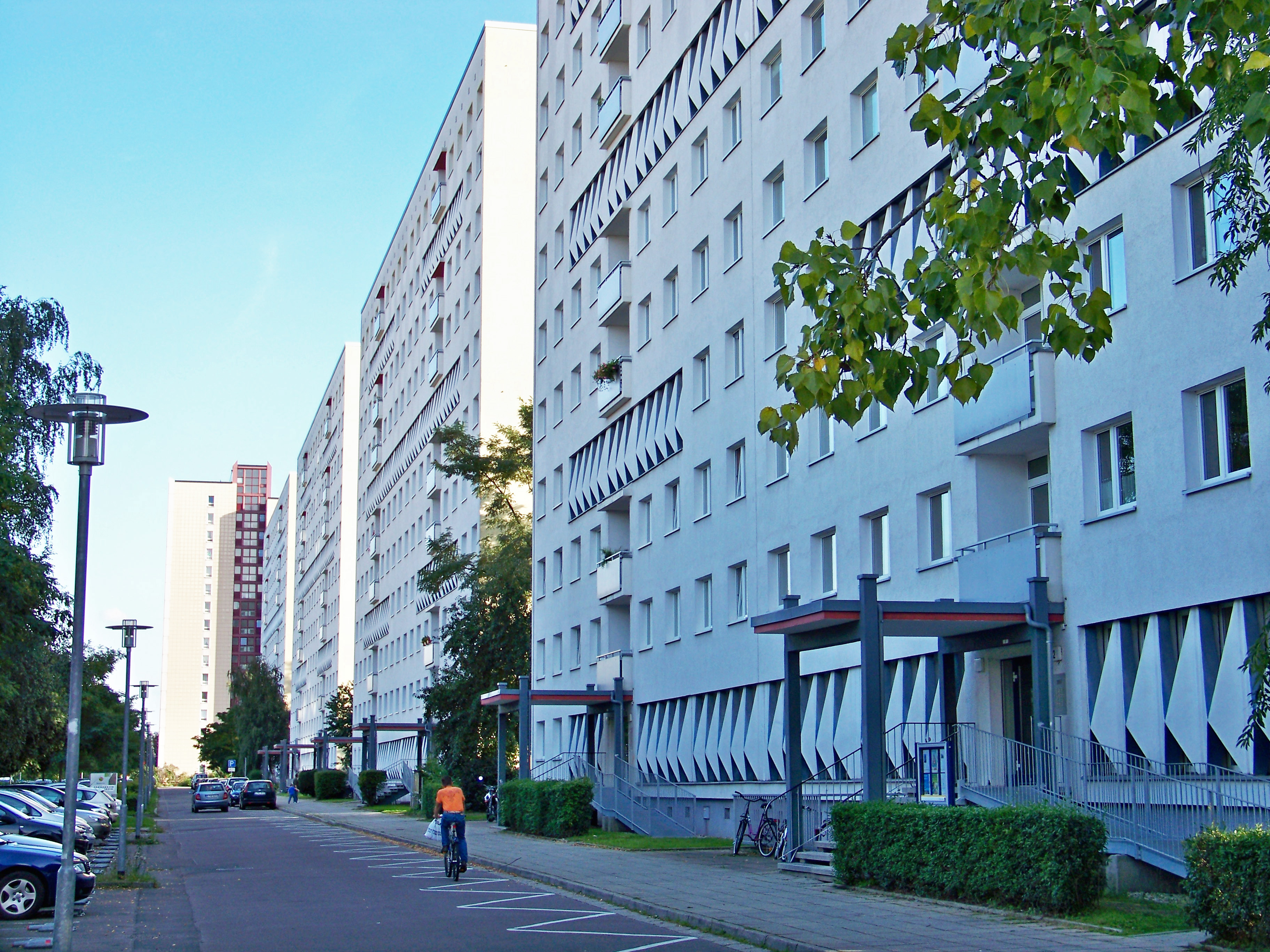
P2 prefabricated buildings

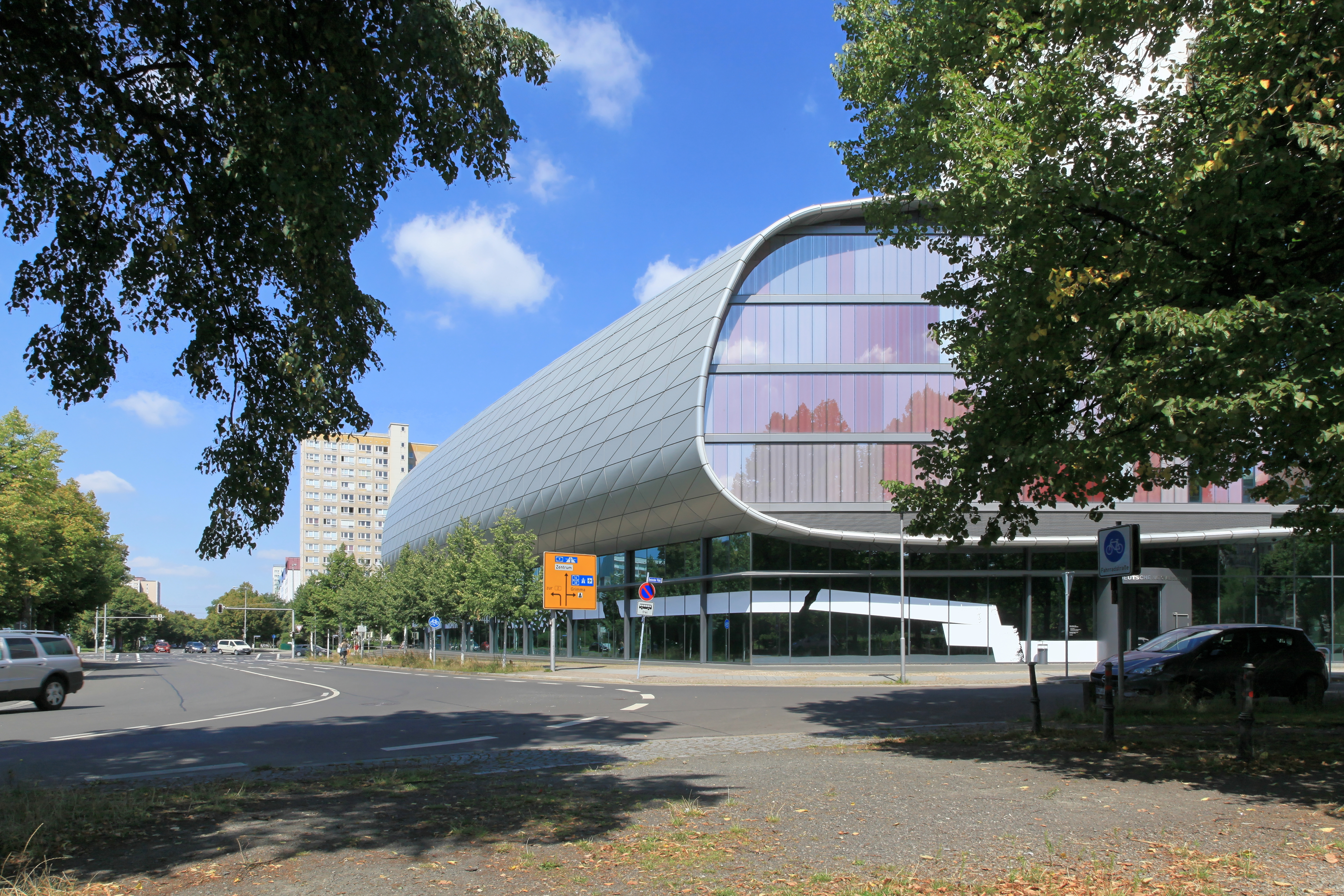
The extension building of the Deutsche Bücherei

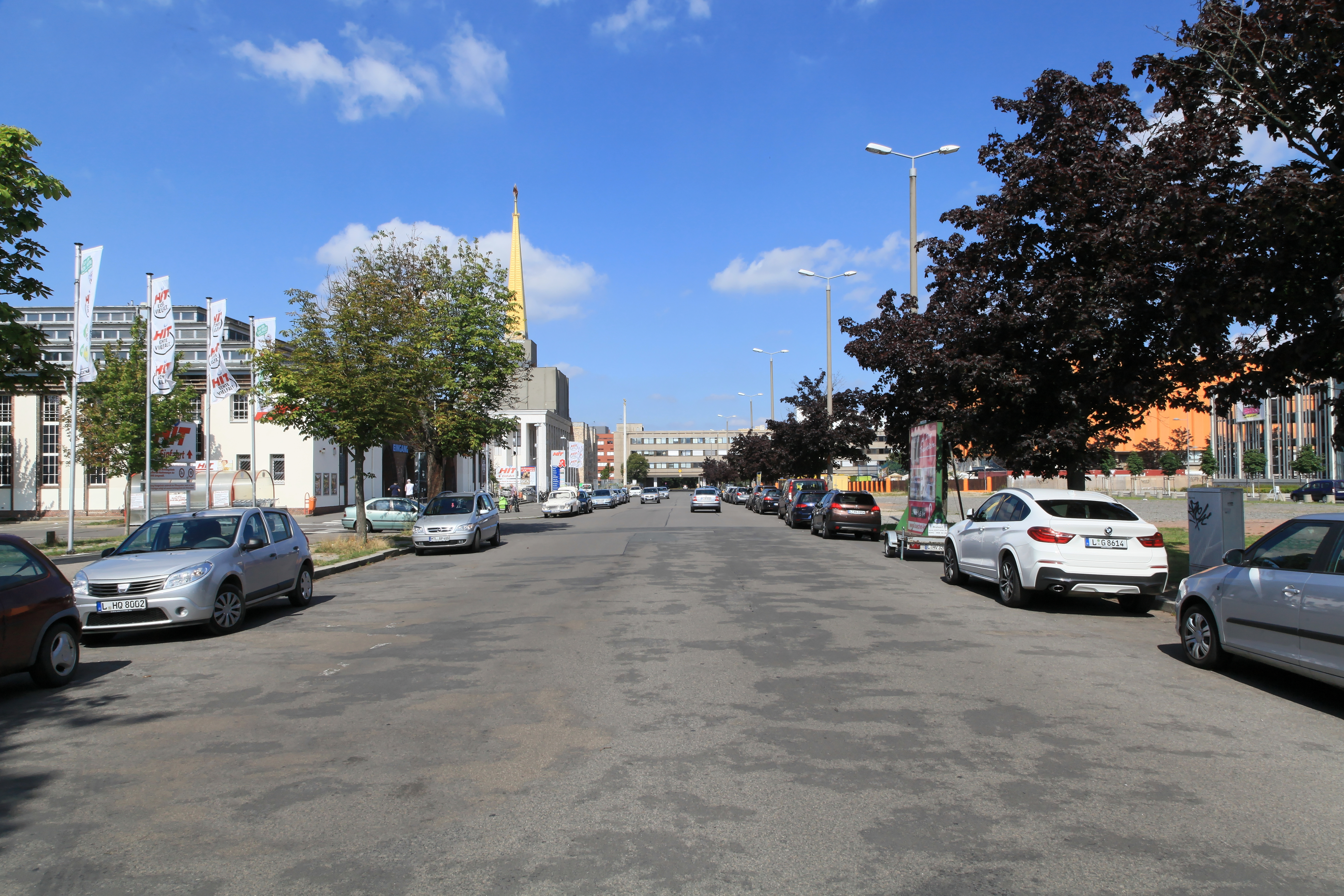
On the Old Exhibition Grounds

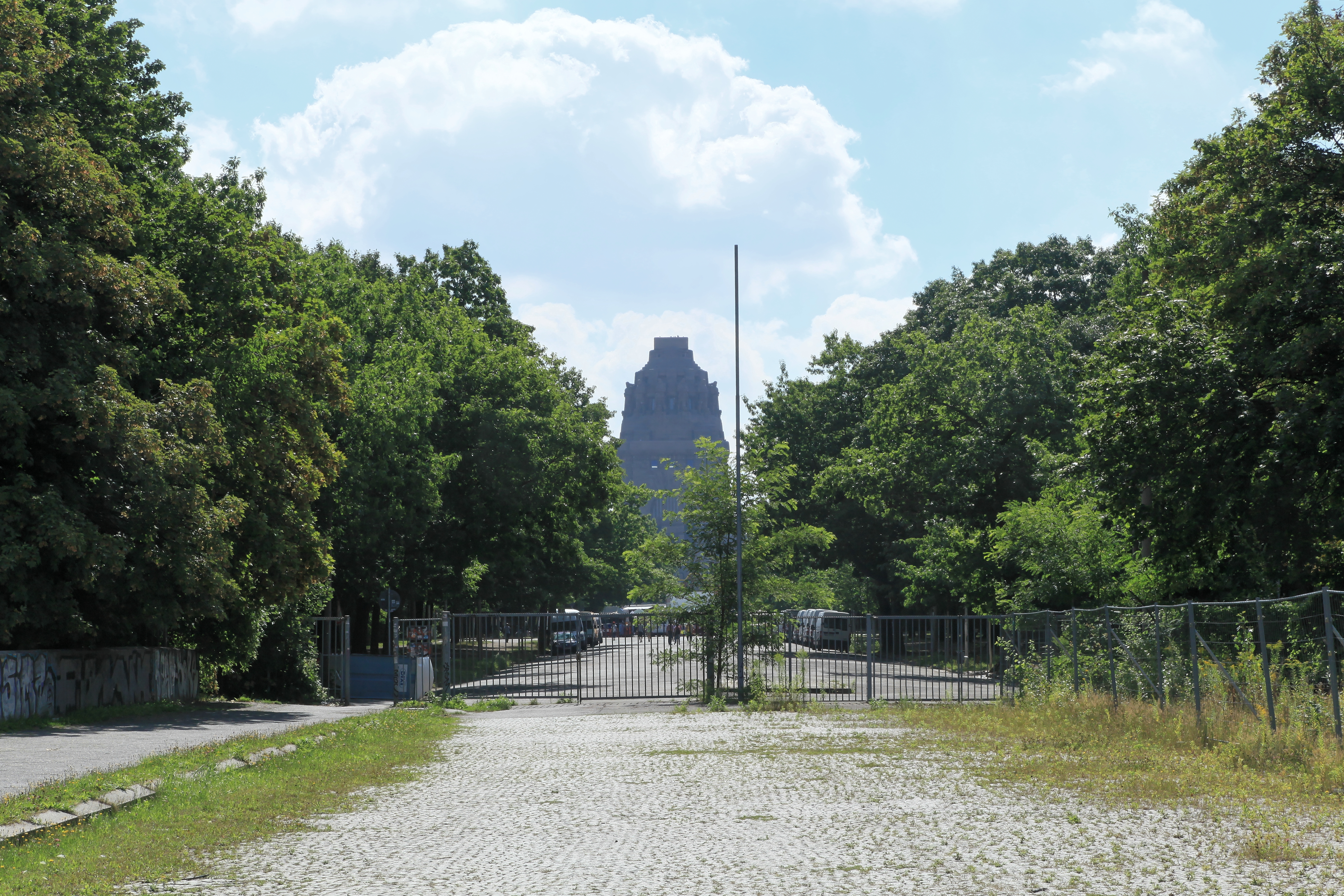
In the Wilhelm-Külz-Park

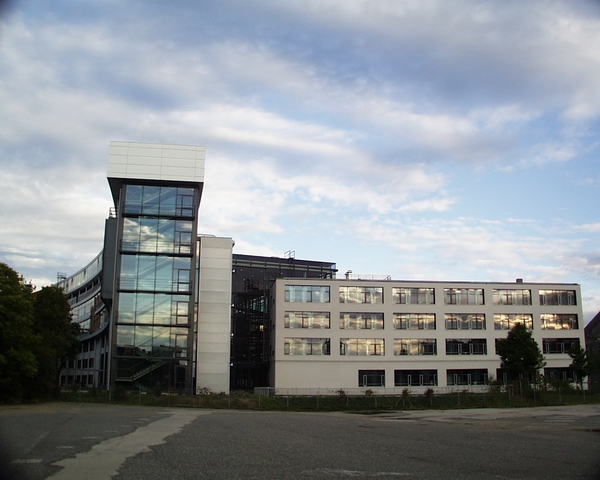
The Max Planck Institute for Evolutionary Anthropology

== History ==
The first considerations for the construction of the road arose in connection with the competition for the construction of the Monument to the Battle of the Nations in the last years of the 19th century. According to a development plan from 1899, the main axis of the Southeastern Vorstadt was to be aligned with the Monument to the Battle of the Nations, which was under construction. A wide boulevard was planned, which was first named in 1909 after a long discussion in the city council.

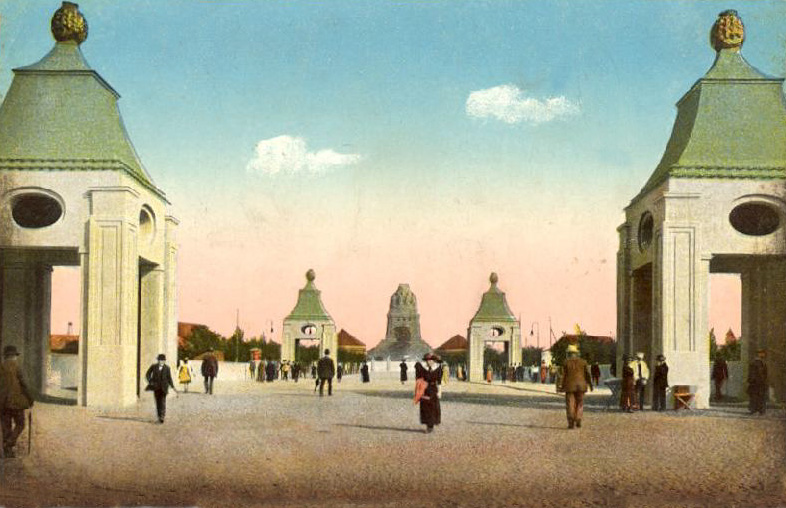
Southeast end of the street to the International Building Exhibition 1913

On a city map from 1914, the street is only built on the later site of the Technical Fair, where the International Construction Exhibition 1913 (Internationale Baufach-Ausstellung 1913) had taken place a year earlier. The elevated crossing over the railway tracks in the direction of the Monument to the Battle of the Nations was also completed.

In 1911, the architect Hans Strobel, who was responsible for Leipzig's urban expansion, had presented a development plan for the outer south-eastern vorstadt, according to which the street was to be developed as a purely residential street without traffic with stately, four-storey houses with front gardens. From 1914 onwards, three such houses were built at the Johannisallee intersection, which have been preserved to this day. Apart from the German Library (1919), there was no further development until after the Second World War, mainly due to the war. Allotment gardens and smaller commercial enterprises spread.

There was no shortage of further planning. They ranged from ten huge trade fair hotels to the complete relocation of Leipzig University to the street to party buildings of the National Socialists.

New residential district

After an ideas contest in 1963, in 1967 a target plan for a new residential area called Messemagistrale on the Strasse des 18. Oktober was ready. Wolfgang Müller was responsible for the urban planning and Wolfgang Scheibe was the leading architect of the implementation planning.

Construction began in February 1968 with the foundations for the boarding schools. During the so-called summer initiative in July 1968, students worked on the construction of the future dormitories, which had been developed from the housing type of the central aisle houses for small apartments.

For the construction of the new residential district, a panel factory was built in Neuwiederitzsch in the north of Leipzig, which began production of the large panel elements in July 1968, especially for the eleven-storey prefabricated building type P2, and which was designed for a capacity of around 1,700 apartments per year. From 1969 onwards, the first buildings were erected according to the so-called 60-day technology – 88 apartments in 60 working days from the start of assembly, including expansion.

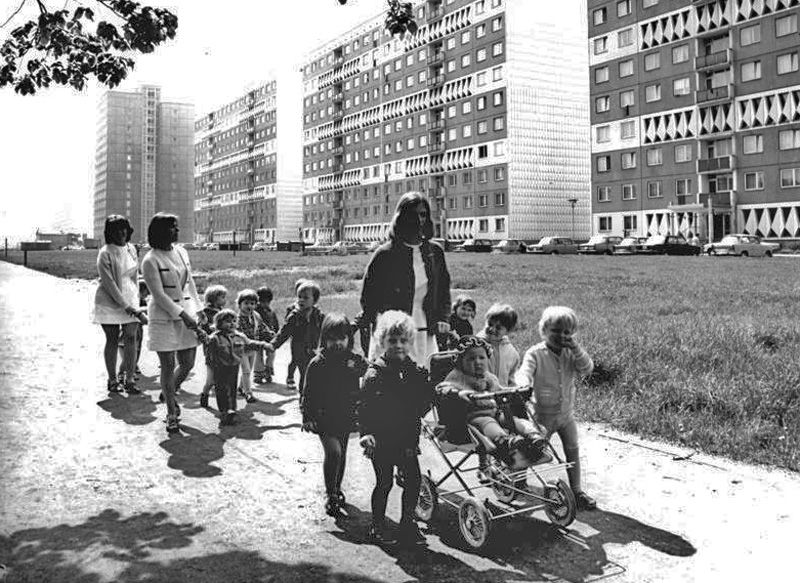
Scene from 1975

In just a few years, around 2,050 apartments, around 4,000 boarding school places, three school buildings, a school sports hall, three Kinderkombinationen (units of day nurseries), a grocery called Kaufhalle and an indoor swimming pool were built in the residential area, for which the name Strasse des 18. Oktober became established. Of the planned district centre with restaurant, library and outpatient clinic, only the foundation and the basement were built, on which only a Kaufhalle was built in 1980.

In 1974, the residential area was completed, which became a very popular one, where members of the East German nomenklatura and celebrities also lived, such as the First Secretary of the SED Bezirk Leipzig leadership Horst Schumann, the Gewandhaus Kapellmeister Kurt Masur, the actress Christa Gottschalk and the pop composer Arndt Bause.

== Public transport ==
The route of the Leipzig tram line 16 is not located in the Strasse des 18. Oktober, but parallel in Philipp-Rosenthal-Strasse (in the north) and in Zwickauer Strasse (in the south). The line crosses the Straße des 18. Oktober in the course of Semmelweisstrasse. The German National Library stop Deutsche Nationalbibliothek is located at this point.

== See also ==
- List of streets and squares in Leipzig
