= Leibniz Institute of Plant Biochemistry =

Research facility in Halle Neustadt, Germany

Leibniz Institute of Plant Biochemistry (IPB)
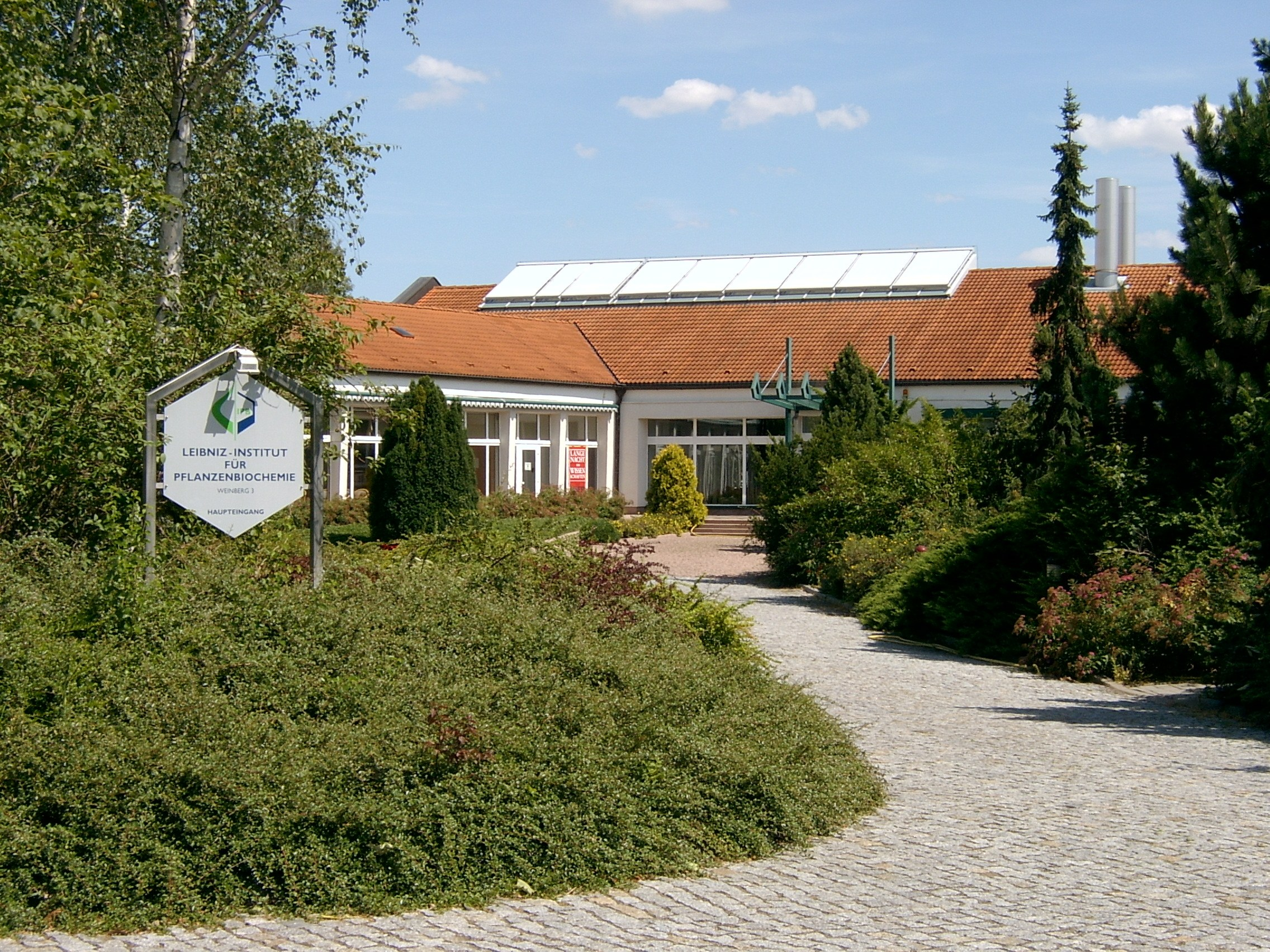
- Founders: Kurth Mothes (1958), Benno Parthier (1992)
- Established: 1958, re-founded 1992
- Board of Directors: Alain Tissier, Steffen Abel, Tina Romeis, Ludger A. Wessjohann
- Faculty: Biochemistry, Biology, Chemistry, Pharmacy
- Address: Weinberg 3, 06120 Halle (Saale), Germany
- Location: Halle (Saale), Saxony-Anhalt, Germany
- Website: www.ipb-halle.de/en/

The Leibniz Institute of Plant Biochemistry (German: Leibniz-Institut für Pflanzenbiochemie, abbreviated: IPB) is a non-university, public research institute located in Halle (Saale), Germany. It carries out basic and applied plant research on model, cultivated and wild plants. Research activities at the institute include natural product chemistry, metabolism and protein biochemistry, cell and plant biology, as well as synthetic biology and biotechnology. The institute is a foundation under public law of the State of Saxony-Anhalt and is a member of the Leibniz Association.

== History ==
The institute was founded in 1958 under Kurt Mothes as "Arbeitsstelle Biochemie der Pflanzen". Shortly after it was named "Institute for Biochemistry of Plants" (IBP) and became a member institution of the German Academy of Sciences of then East Germany. From 1968 to 1989, Klaus Schreiber served as director of the institute, followed by Klaus Müntz (1989-1990) and Benno Parthier (1990-1997).

After the German reunification, the institute was refounded in 1992 as "Leibniz Institute of Plant Biochemistry" (IPB) and became part of the Leibniz Association of research institutions publicly funded by the federal government and the federal state.

== Activities and structure ==
IPB research focuses on plant-related small molecules. It aims to explore the chemical diversity, biosynthesis, biological roles and mechanisms of action of plant and fungal natural products including specialized metabolites and chemical mediators. Interdisciplinary approaches at the interface between chemistry and biology encompass

- natural product chemistry,
- synthetic chemistry,
- plant metabolism and protein biochemistry,
- cell biology and plant physiology,
- synthetic biology and biotechnology.

Research at the IPB is conducted in four scientific departments

- Bioorganic Chemistry,
- Molecular Signal Processing,
- Cell and Metabolic Biology,
- Biochemistry of Plant Interactions,

as well as two Junior Research Groups and one Program Center for Plant Metabolomics and Computational Biochemistry (MetaCom)

The IPB employs ca. 200 people, 100 of whom are scientists.

== Cooperation ==
The IPB and the Martin Luther University of Halle-Wittenberg (MLU) entertain close collaborations in research and teaching. The IPB's four department chairs and one junior research group leader are university professors jointly appointed by the MLU and the IPB. In addition, close collaborative ties exist with the Leibniz Institute of Plant Genetics and Crop Plant Research (IPK) in Gatersleben. The IPB is a founding member of the ScienceCampus Halle - Plant-based Bioeconomy and a member of the German Centre for Integrative Biodiversity Research (iDiv) consortium.
