= Alte Messe Leipzig =

Old fair site in Leipzig (Germany)

Coordinates: 51.318°N 12.400°E

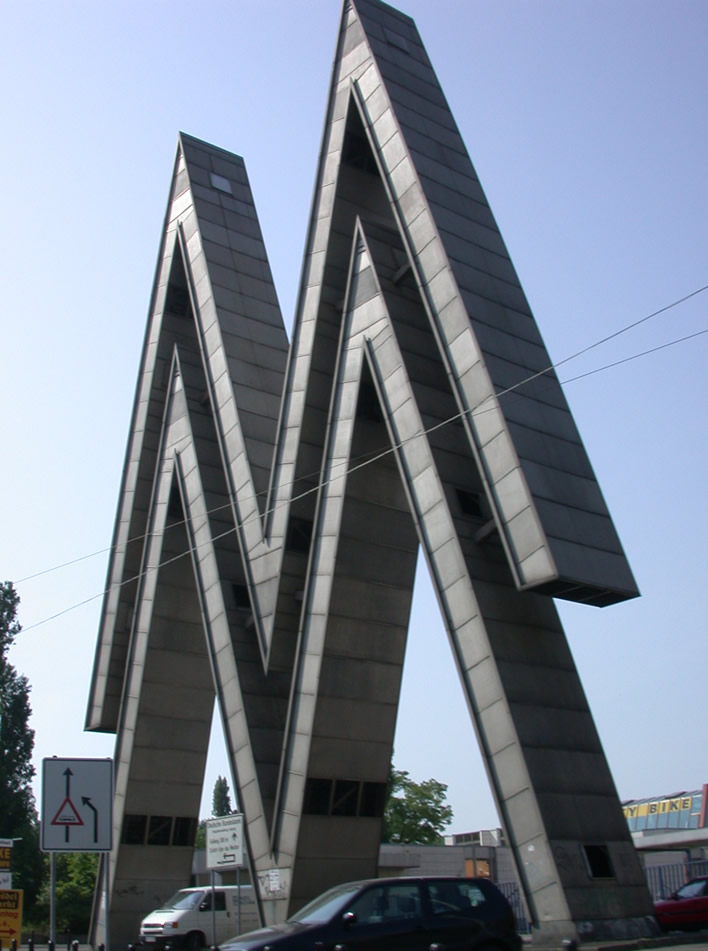
The icon of the Leipzig trade fair at the east gate of the former site. The double M stands for "Muster Messe". It is 28 m (92 ft) tall.

Alte Messe Leipzig (Old trade fair of Leipzig) is the circa 50 hectares (120 acres) site in the southeastern part of Leipzig's district Mitte, where from 1920 until 1991 the technical exhibitions of the Leipzig Trade Fair took place, as well as the buildings that stand on it – but not the trade fair itself, which found a new home at a new site in the northern part of Leipzig. Since 1996 there has been no trade fair activity on the old site.

== Location ==
The old site is about three kilometres (two miles) from the city centre in the southeast. It is bordered in the north by Deutscher Platz and Philipp-Rosenthal-Straße, in the east by Prager Straße and the Leipzig Hbf–Leipzig-Connewitz railway line, in the south by Richard-Lehmann-Straße and in the west by Zwickauer Straße. The old site belongs to the district Zentrum-Südost (Centre-Southeast). The adjacent boroughs are Reudnitz-Thonberg, Stötteritz, Marienbrunn and Südvorstadt.

A straight line between the 114.7 m (376 ft) tall tower of the New Town Hall of Leipzig and the 91 m (299 ft) tall Monument to the Battle of the Nations – the so-called axis of the 18 October – goes through the old site. The axis is marked by the Street of 18 October (Straße des 18. Oktober) which is crossed at the old site orthogonally by a street named Alte Messe. Coming from today's point of intersection of both these streets, the old site was developed from 1913.

== History ==
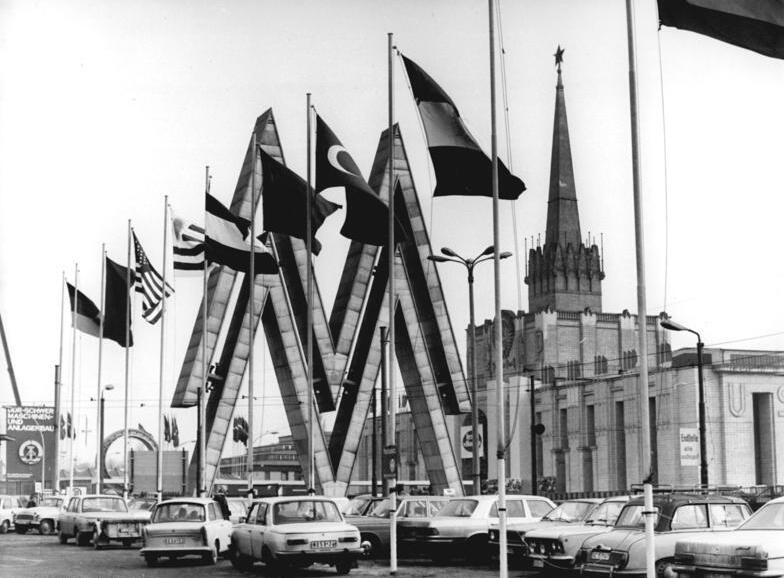
North gate and Soviet pavilion (1974)

In 1913 an International Architecture Exhibition (Internationale Bauausstellung), opened in Leipzig in the presence of the last King of Saxony. For this, a new exhibition site was created behind the Thonberg manor on what had been farmland. This exhibition was followed in 1914 by an International Exhibition for Book Manufacturing and Art Work (Internationale Ausstellung für Buchgewerbe und Graphik, or Bugra) with 2.3 million visitors. In 1920, in three of the exhibition halls was held the Technical Trade and Construction Fair, which had taken place elsewhere in Leipzig from 1918. The economic development of the 1920s led to an enormous extension by the erection of further exhibition halls on the site. In 1928, there were 17 exhibition halls and several smaller structures with a total of 130,000 m^{2} (1,400,000 sq ft) of exhibition space. In 1930, the International Fur Trade Exhibition (Internationale Pelzfach-Ausstellung) brought another heyday.

During World War II, the arms industry occupied several halls in the form of aircraft production and maintenance. In the allied air raid of 4 December 1943, halls 4 and 14 respectively were completely and partly destroyed.

The first Trade Fair after the war was held in four halls in 1946. In the following years, several extensions, rebuildings and new constructions were carried out, among them in 1950 the conversion of the former Achilleion into the Soviet Pavilion, exhibition hall 7 (1977), exhibition hall 22 (1989–1992) and an administration building at the north gate. There also arose a lot of smaller buildings and temporary arrangements. From 1991 until 1996 some specialised fairs were undertaken, before the newly built exhibition halls in the north of Leipzig went into service in 1996.

== Cultural heritage monuments ==
Some of the exhibition halls on the site are listed as cultural heritage monuments, in whole or in part. The listed buildings originated from the beginning (1920–1928) of the Technical Trade Fair on the site of Alte Messe when the Leipzig Trade Fair grew to become a World Trade Fair.

In the strategy document 2020 of the municipality of Leipzig, it is explained that the portico of the former exhibition hall 12 and the entirety of the former exhibition hall 16 have to be conserved in any circumstance; whereas the fates of other buildings are to be decided from case to case. Also, the preservation of exhibition hall 15, a milestone in the history of construction, could be secured by the buyer of the hall, a bicycle retailer.

Listed fair halls

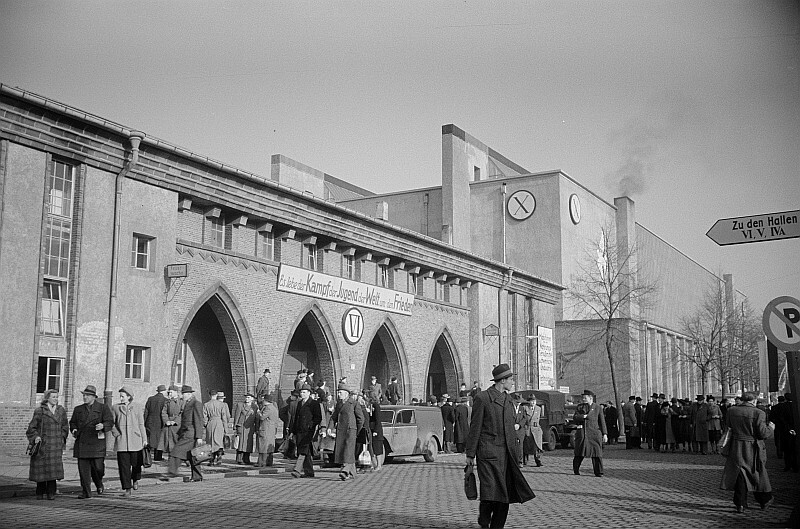
Hall 11 left.
Hall 15 right (1951)

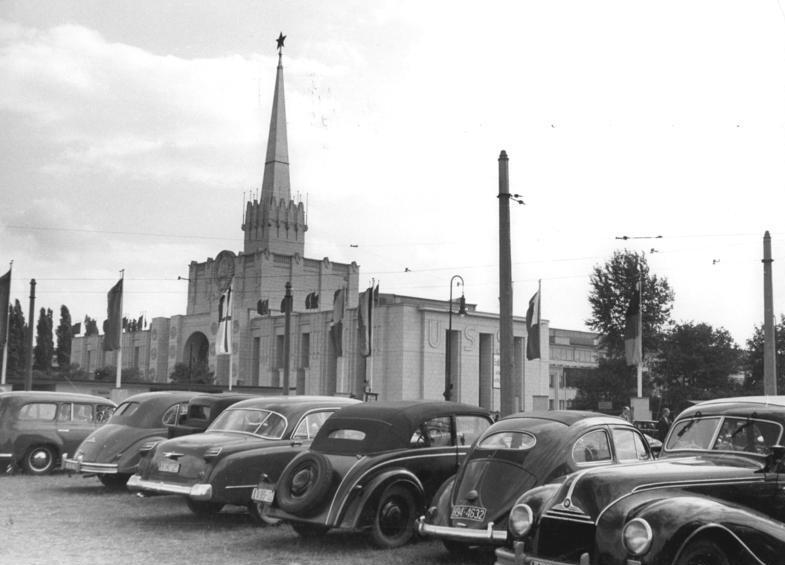
Hall 12 (1954)

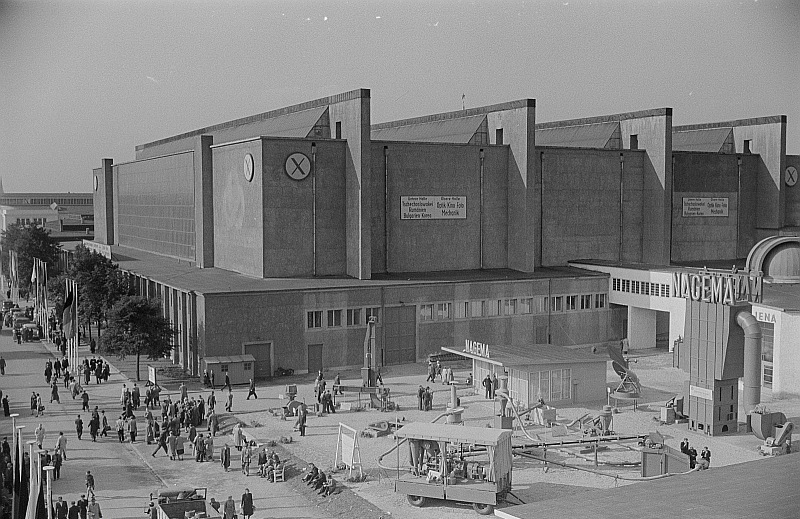
Hall 15 (1952)

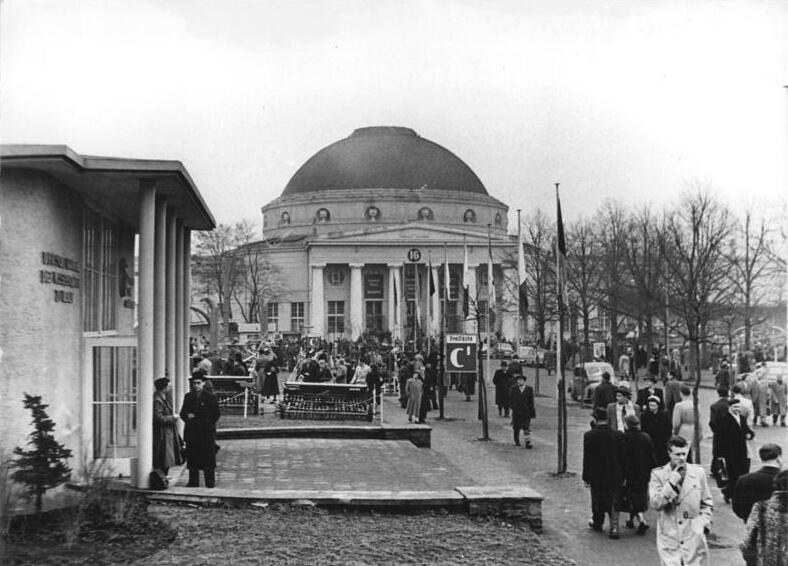
Hall 16 (1957)

Exhibition hall 11, built in 1924
The hall is renovated, owned by HIT Handelsgruppe, since 2003 a shopping centre. Its preservation is secured.
Exhibition hall 12, built in 1925
From 1927 commonly named Achilleion; since 1950 under the name "Soviet Pavilion". The exhibition hall was extended in the mid-1920s for a Palace of Sports during the winter months. From 1950, its portico, topped by the Soviet star (at a height of 64 m, or 210 ft), exactly in the vista of the axis of 18 October and often appearing on stamps and pictures, was commonly used as an image of the fair. The building was used by the Soviet Union for its trade exhibitions. In 1977, the Soviet Union permitted the redesign of the facade. In 1996, Leipzig purchased the Soviet Pavilion for 20 million Deutsche Mark from the Chamber of Commerce in Moscow. In 2003, the white tiles had to be taken off for security reasons. The portico is listed, like three other objects at the Alte Messe. The hall behind the portico was in urgent need of rehabilitation. The head building and the portico of the hall were renovated until 2018, the parts behind were going to be rebuilt new. The first stone laying was on 28 November 2016, the inauguration on 29 October 2019. The preservation of the head building and the portico is secured.

Exhibition hall 15, built in 1927/28
A 20 m (66 ft) tall structure of steel with a 100 m (330 ft) wide column-free interior space. Due to its impressive dimensions, this building was one of the most photographed buildings of the old trade fair. Like exhibition hall 16, which demonstrated reinforced concrete construction, exhibition hall 15 demonstrated steel construction. It was erected in just four months before the trade fair in spring 1928. The column-free span length was a world record at the time. The hall anticipated the evolution of structural engineering in the 20th century, the erection of halls with enormous uninterrupted spaces.

After severe war destruction, only 60 per cent of the hall could be restructured until 1951, and in the interior metal pillars and a gallery could be built. After a long vacancy the bicycle trader Stadtler purchased hall 15 in 2015. Reconstruction began in 2018 and re-established the hall in its dimensions of 1928. Thus this cultural heritage monument was secured. Its inauguration was on 4 April 2019.

Exhibition hall 16, built in 1912/13
Known as "Eventpalast" or People's Palace, Concrete Hall, Pantheon Leipzig, domed structure of the architect Wilhelm Kreis. This is the oldest building of Alte Messe. It began as Concrete Hall at the 1913 International Architecture Exhibition; it was later used as exhibition hall, for events up to 2000 guests and for transmissions of the MDR. It demonstrated reinforced concrete construction. The building is dominated by a dome 30 m (98 ft) in diameter which covers a 28 m (92 ft) tall hall and – together with its front building – evokes the Pantheon in Rome. In a construction time lasting just six months, 24,000 tons of concrete and 400 tons of steel were employed. The concrete facade was used in the way of a stonecutter and demonstrated the architectural possibilities of reinforced concrete constructions. Today, the dome is in a good state. The preservation of this cultural heritage monument is secured.

Exhibition hall 17, built in 1920/21
This hall is the earliest still preserved that was built explicitly for the purposes of the Technical Trade and Construction Fair. Industrial architecture of the early 1920s. After 2020 it was refurbished for a Hornbach Baumarkt.

== New uses for the other land and buildings ==
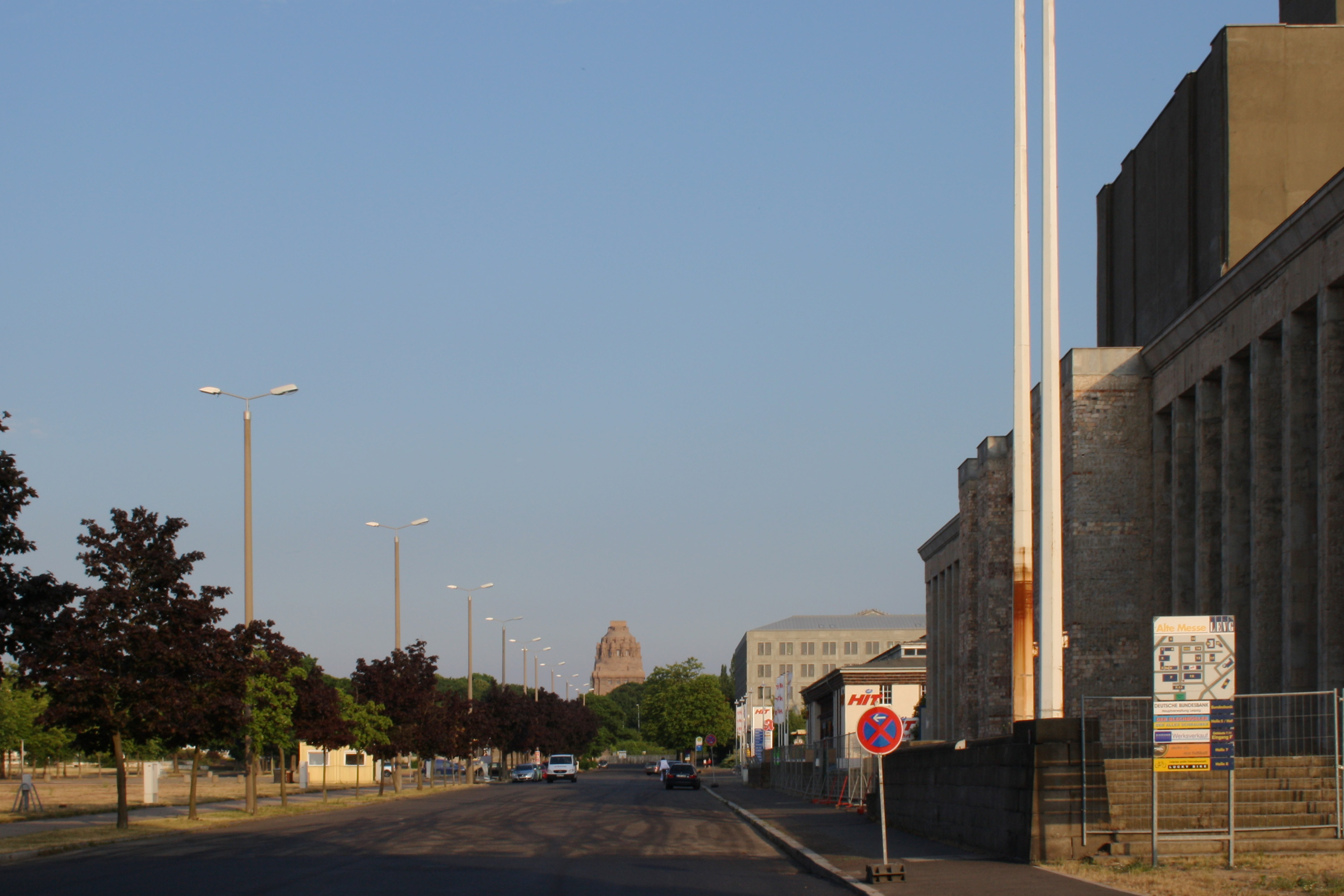
Street of 18 October with Achilleion, Shopping centre, Building of the German Central Bank und Monument of the Battle of Nations

Since 1996 the Alte Messe has been transformed for science, business, trade and enterprises according to a general plan decided by the city council in 1993. The development is driven by Leipziger Entwicklungs- und Vermarktungsgesellschaft (LEVG). Firstly, for preparation all temporary arrangements were removed and several demolished. The fence around the site was removed. A new street and tramway track named Zwickauer Straße was built through the area. Furthermore, the other streets on the site got names: Alte Messe, Perlick-, Pusch-, Otto- and Landsteinerstraße. The single plots and buildings have been offered for sale. Also the surroundings of the former site have been partially developed, especially the huge double domed hall of the former central market. (Vernacular name: Kohlrabi circus)

The major challenge is that it is often simpler to develop an unbuilt area than a built area, especially if the latter has listed buildings. At Alte Messe, there are some listed buildings. This is considered in the utilisation concept. After some difficulties at the start, a multitude of investments have been made. In 2022 a reporter wrote that the charm of musty-smelling, empty exhibition halls of the GDR has given way to a considerable buzz of activity. The utilisation concept of Alte Messe schedules four different main focuses:

- Science/biotechnology/health
- Mile of car traders
- Entertainment/sports/culture/gastronomy
- Trade

=== Science and health ===
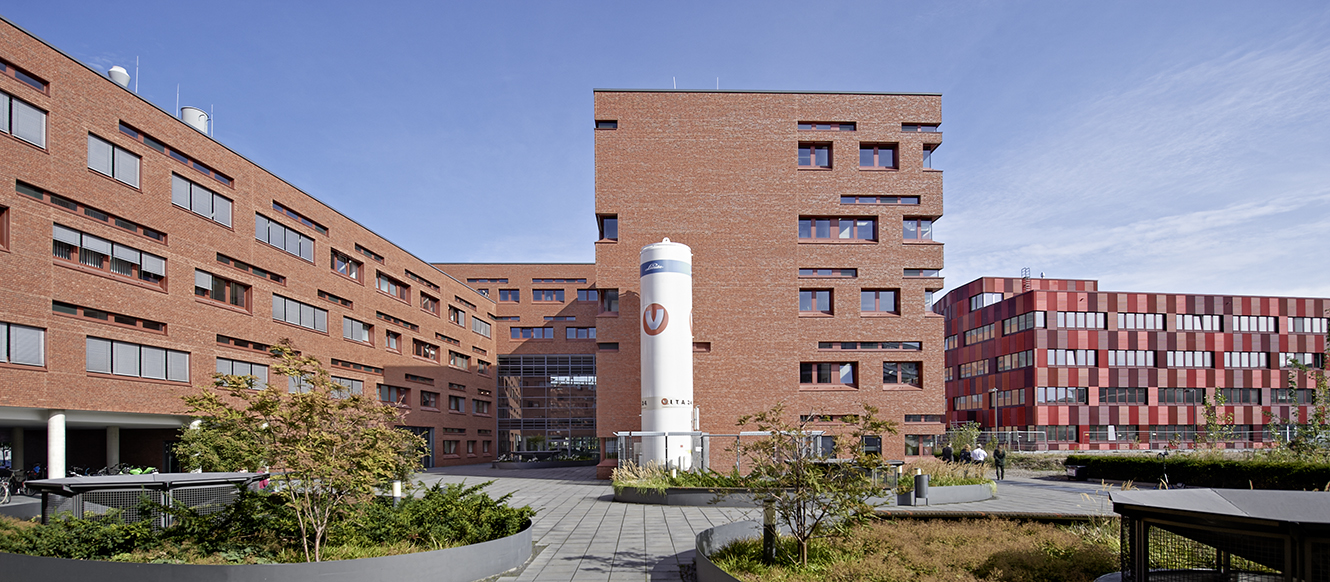
BioCity and BioCube

Between Alte Messe and the German National Library at Deutscher Platz have been built Bio City Leipzig and the Max Planck Institute for Evolutionary Anthropology as a centre of science. In 2008 the Fraunhofer Institute for Cell Therapy and Immunology (IZI) was finished; its annexes are called "daughter-cells". In 2013, "BioCube" beside Bio City was opened, some tenants of the last one moved into the new building. Alongside Bio City is also housed Inspirata, a collection of interactive mathematical and natural scientific exhibits. The building of the Bio City Leipzig (Architects: Spengler . Wiescholek from Hamburg) was in 2003 awarded the Architekturpreis der Stadt Leipzig (Architecture Award of the City of Leipzig). In October 2021, the significant growing biotechnological business c-LEcta saved its place in the new BioSquare whose construction started in 2022.

=== Sports, leisure and gastronomy ===
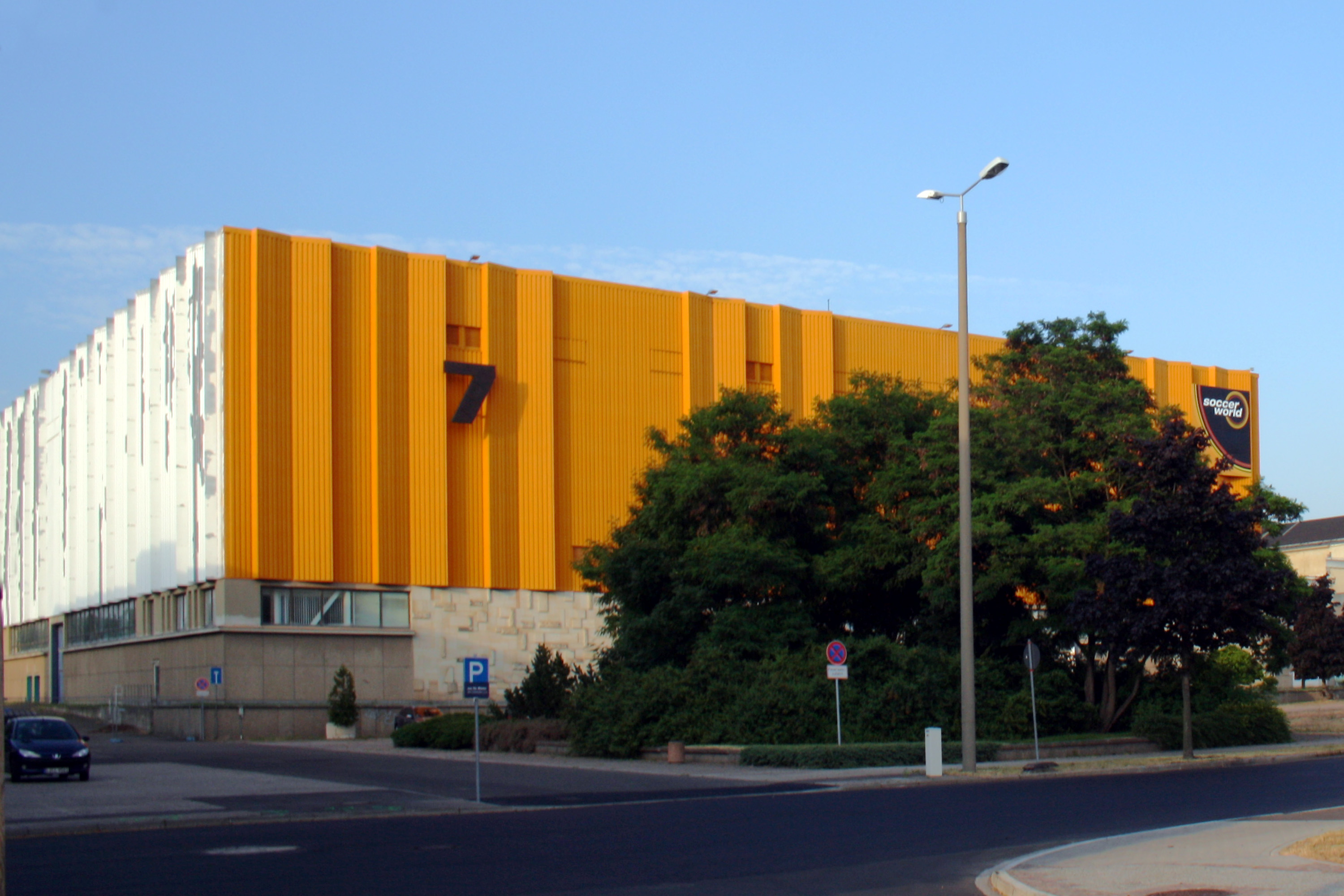
Exhibition hall 7 – Soccer World

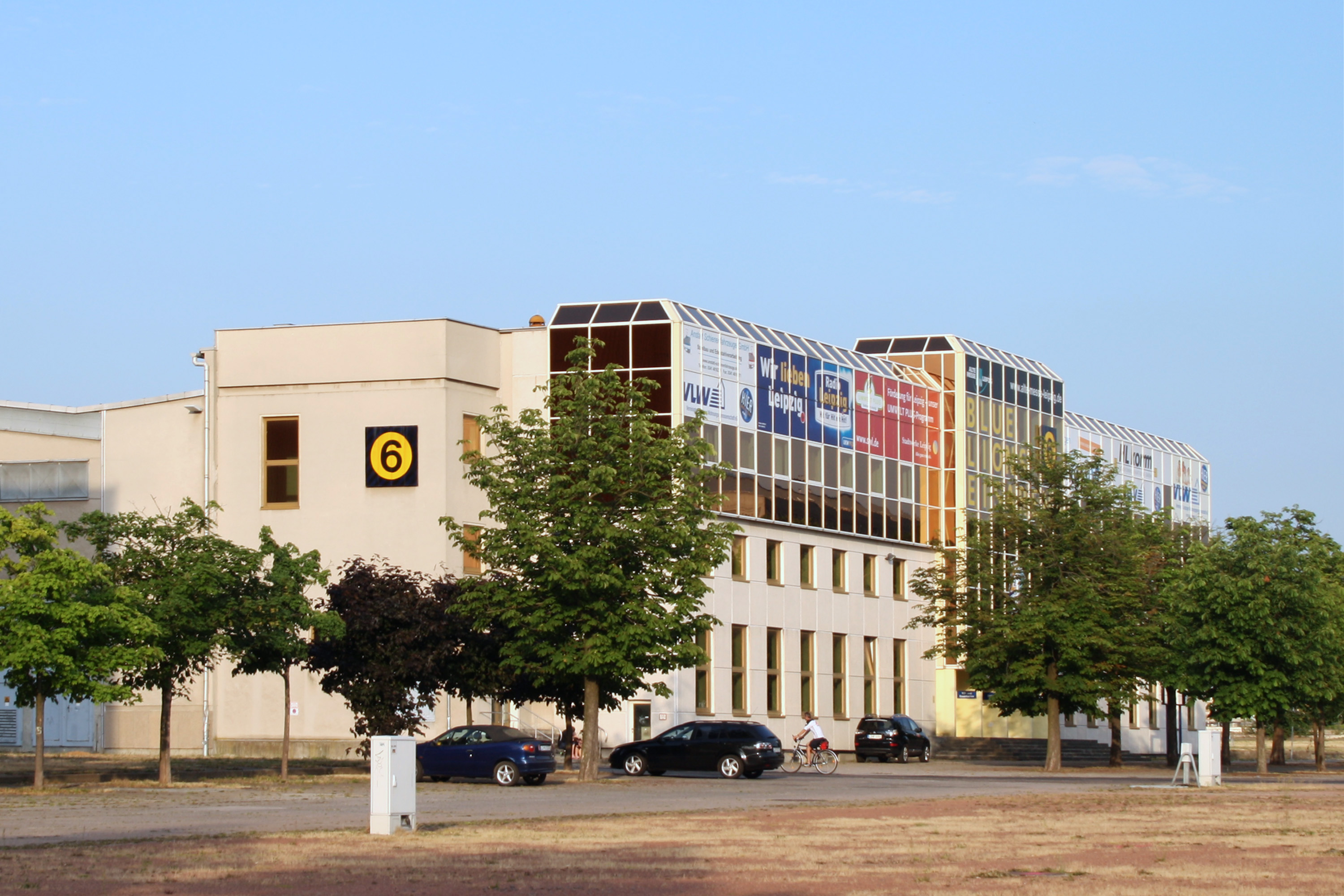
Former exhibition hall 6 was an ice stadium

Over the years, some facilities for football, ice hockey and beach volleyball were built, some of them in combination with gastronomic businesses.

Exhibition hall 7 with 8700 m^{2} (93,646 sq ft) is used for football and offers ten playing fields.

Exhibition hall 6, now dismantled, housed an ice stadium. It was the home of the club Icefighters Leipzig and was big enough for 2000 guests. In the summertime, there is also an urban beach with playing fields for beach volleyball.

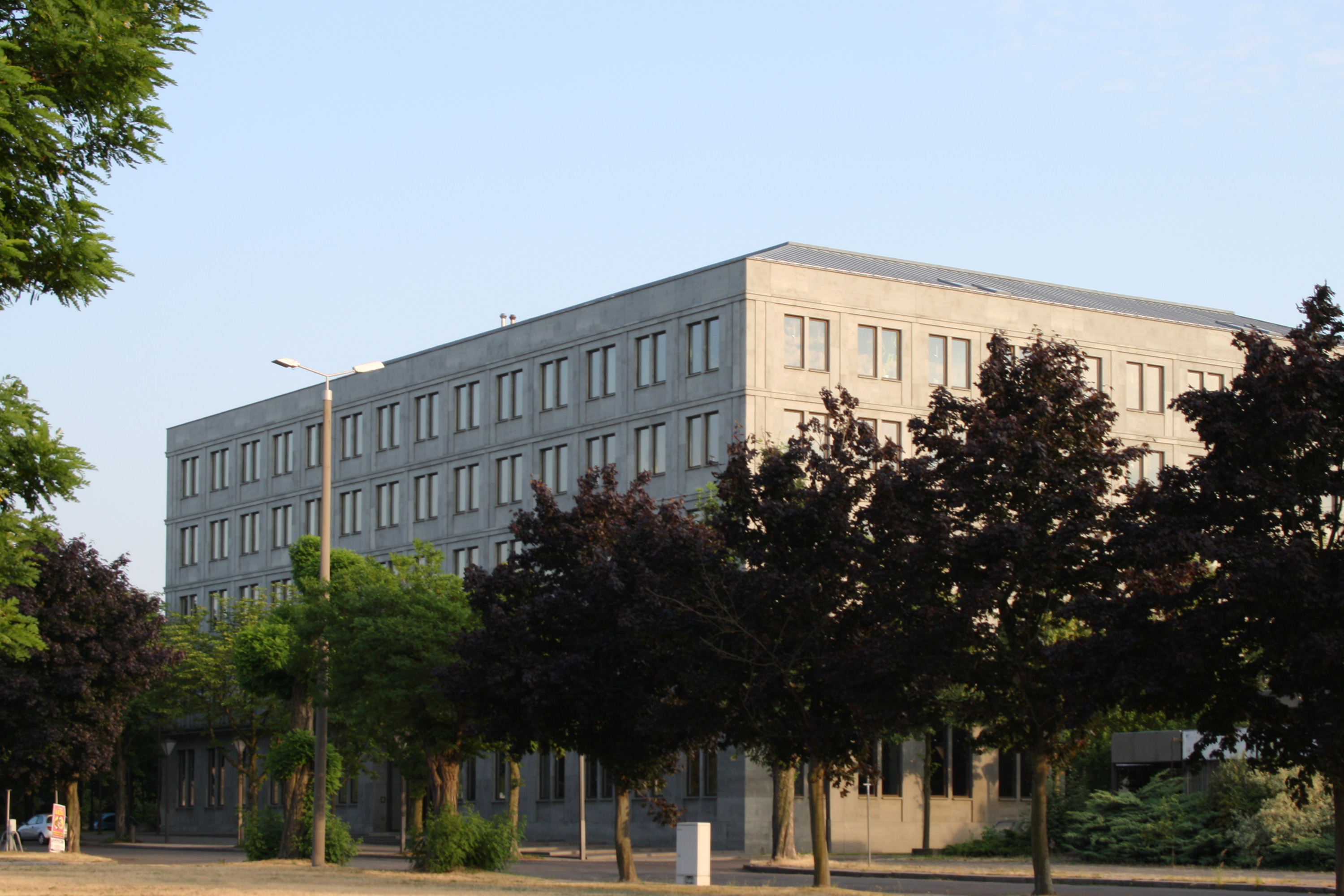
Building of the German Central Bank, Architect: Hans Kollhoff

In 2006, the former exhibition hall 16, the only surviving hall of 1913 at Alte Messe (then called "hall of concrete"), was converted into a dance club named Volkspalast (People's Palace), since 2012 Eventpalast. Under its dome, 32 m (105 ft) in diameter, the club can host up to 2000 guests. In the summer months at the southern part of the site there is a drive-in theater.

=== Bank and retail sale ===
At Alte Messe, in a 1996 building, is one of the nine head offices of the German Central Bank. This building (Architects: Hans Kollhoff and Helga Timmermann from Berlin) was in 1999 awarded the Architekturpreis der Stadt Leipzig (Architecture Award of the City of Leipzig).

On a plot of 71,000 m^{2} (760,000 sq ft), where the old exhibition halls 1–6 were opened in 2013, is a retail furniture store, Porta Möbel.

=== Automobile ===
On and around the site of Alte Messe over the years was developed a so-called Automeile (Mile of car traders) with dealerships of the brands Audi, BMW, Chrysler, Dodge, Honda, Jeep, Mercedes-Benz and Volkswagen supplemented by a centre of Triumph Motorcycles and a car components store.

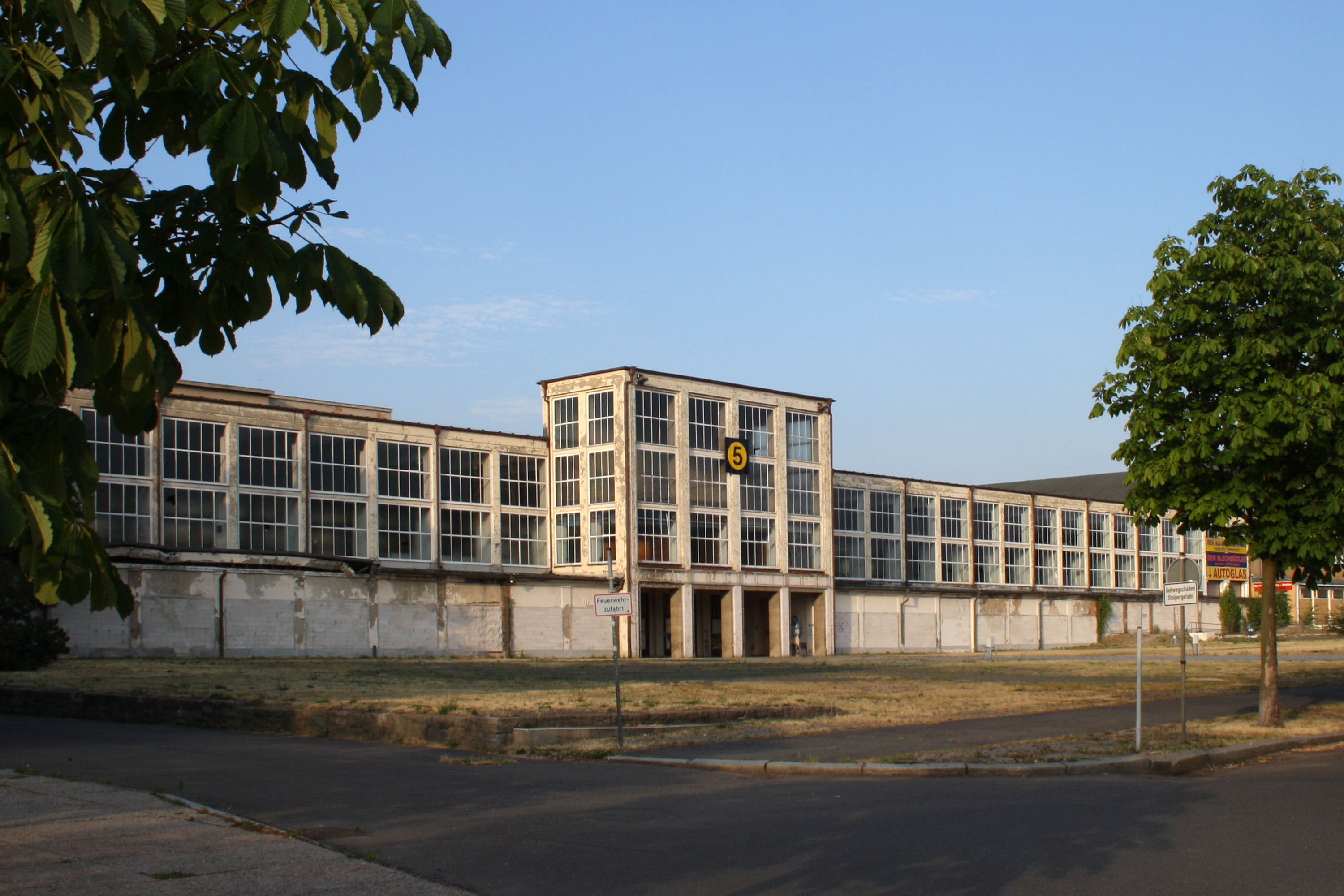
Former exhibition hall 5 (since demolished)

=== Religion ===
In 2008, the association Verein Pavillon der Hoffnung in Leipzig e. V. – Förderverein Ökumenisches Zentrum bought hall 14, which had been built in 1985 by VEB Carl Zeiss Jena, and named it Pavillon der Hoffnung (Pavilion of Hope). It holds Christian activities of various kinds.

== Transport connection ==
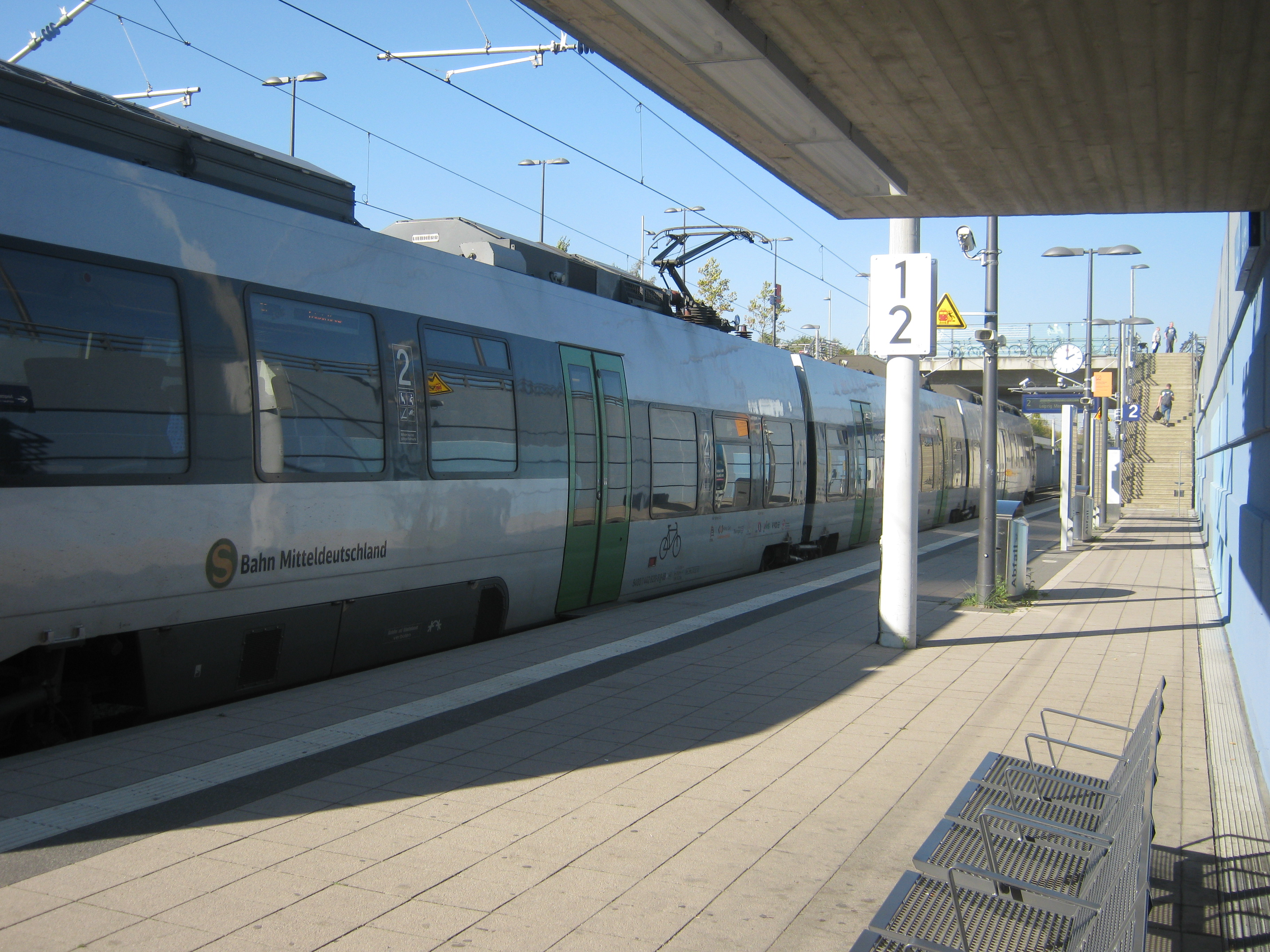
Public transit stop Leipzig MDR

The Alte Messe site is very well accessible by capable roads from every direction and by the public transit system "S-Bahn Mitteldeutschland", by the Leipzig tramway network and by bus. The names of the public transit stops:

- Leipzig MDR in the west
- Leipzig Völkerschlachtdenkmal in the southeast

The names of the tram stops:

- Tram line 16: Stops Deutsche Nationalbibliothek and An den Tierkliniken.
- Tram line 2: Stops Deutsche Nationalbibliothek and Altes Messegelände.

Aside from that busses are running on the routes 70 and 74.

== Literature ==
- BUGRA-Ansichten. Historische Bilder der Internationalen Ausstellung für Buchgewerbe und Graphik Leipzig 1914 (in German). Leipzig: Kunstverlag H.C.Schmiedicke. 1988. ISBN 3-7492-0286-9.
- Denzel, Markus A. (2019a). von Hehl, Ulrich (ed.). Aufstieg zur "Weltmesse" (in German). Leipzig: Leipziger Universitätsverlag. pp. 168–175. ISBN 978-3-86583-804-9.
- Denzel, Markus A. (2019b). von Hehl, Ulrich (ed.). Die Leipziger Messe im Messesystem der Bundesrepublik Deutschland (in German). Leipzig: Leipziger Universitätsverlag. pp. 862–863. ISBN 978-3-86583-804-9.
- Harbusch, Gregor (27 November 2020). "Messehallen in Leipzig werden zu Archiv und Fahrradmarkt". Deutsches Architektenblatt Online – dabonline (in German). Handelsblatt Media Group.
- Heinker, Helge-Heinz (2019). von Hehl, Ulrich (ed.). Die erste Friedensmesse 1946 (in German). Leipzig: Leipziger Universitätsverlag. pp. 541–546. ISBN 978-3-86583-804-9.
- Hellmuth, Anette (1997). Rodekamp, Volker (ed.). Zur Planungs- und Baugeschichte der Alten Technischen Messe in Leipzig (in German). Leipzig: Leipziger Messe Verlag. pp. 123–132. ISBN 3-9805084-2-0.
- Hocquél, Wolfgang (1994). "Das Gelände der Technischen Messe am Völkerschlachtdenkmal". Die Architektur der Leipziger Messe (in German). Berlin: Verlag für das Bauwesen. pp. 157–170. ISBN 3-345-00575-1.
- Leonhardt, Peter (2007). Moderne in Leipzig. Architektur und Städtebau 1918 bis 1933 (in German). Leipzig: Pro Leipzig. ISBN 978-3-936508-29-1.
- Leonhardt, Peter (2019a). von Hehl, Ulrich (ed.). Architektur und Städtebau. Messebauten (in German). Leipzig: Leipziger Universitätsverlag. pp. 196–198. ISBN 978-3-86583-804-9.
- Leonhardt, Peter (2019b). "Der Sowjetische Pavillon auf der Alten Messe in Leipzig" [The Soviet Pavilion at the old fair site in Leipzig]. Sächsische Heimatblätter (in German). 65 (2): 184–192. doi:10.52410/shb.Bd.65.2019.H.2.S.184-192.
- Lütke Daldrup, Engelbert (1999). "Landeszentralbank of Saxony and Thuringia". Leipzig. Bauten 1989–1999 / Leipzig. Buildings 1989–1999. Basel / Berlin / Boston: Birkhäuser Verlag. pp. 122–123. ISBN 3-7643-5957-9.
- Riedel, Horst (2005). Stadtlexikon Leipzig von A bis Z. Leipzig: Pro Leipzig. ISBN 3-936508-03-8.
- Ringel, Sebastian (2015). Leipzig! One Thousand Years of History. Leipzig: Author and Edition Leipzig in the Seemann Henschel GmbH & Co. KG. pp. 181–183. ISBN 978-3-361-00710-9.
- Ritter, Jens (2018). "Rekonstruktion und Neunutzung der Messehalle 15 auf dem Gelände der Alten Messe in Leipzig" [Reconstruction and new utilization of the exhibition hall 15 on the old fair site in Leipzig] (PDF). Stahlbau (in German). 87 (4): 382–398. doi:10.1002/stab.201810591.
- Scheffler, Tanja (2015). Bodenschatz, Harald (ed.). The Technical Fair Site in Leipzig in the Period of National Socialism (Bauwelt Fundamente 153 ed.). Basel / Berlin / Boston: Birkhäuser Verlag. pp. 166–182. doi:10.1515/9783038215134. ISBN 978-3-03821-660-5.
- Zirkel, Peter (2021). Sowjetischer Pavillon Leipzig: Substanz oder Erscheinung (in German). M. Books. ISBN 978-3-944425-17-7.
