= Deutscher Platz =

Square in Leipzig, Germany

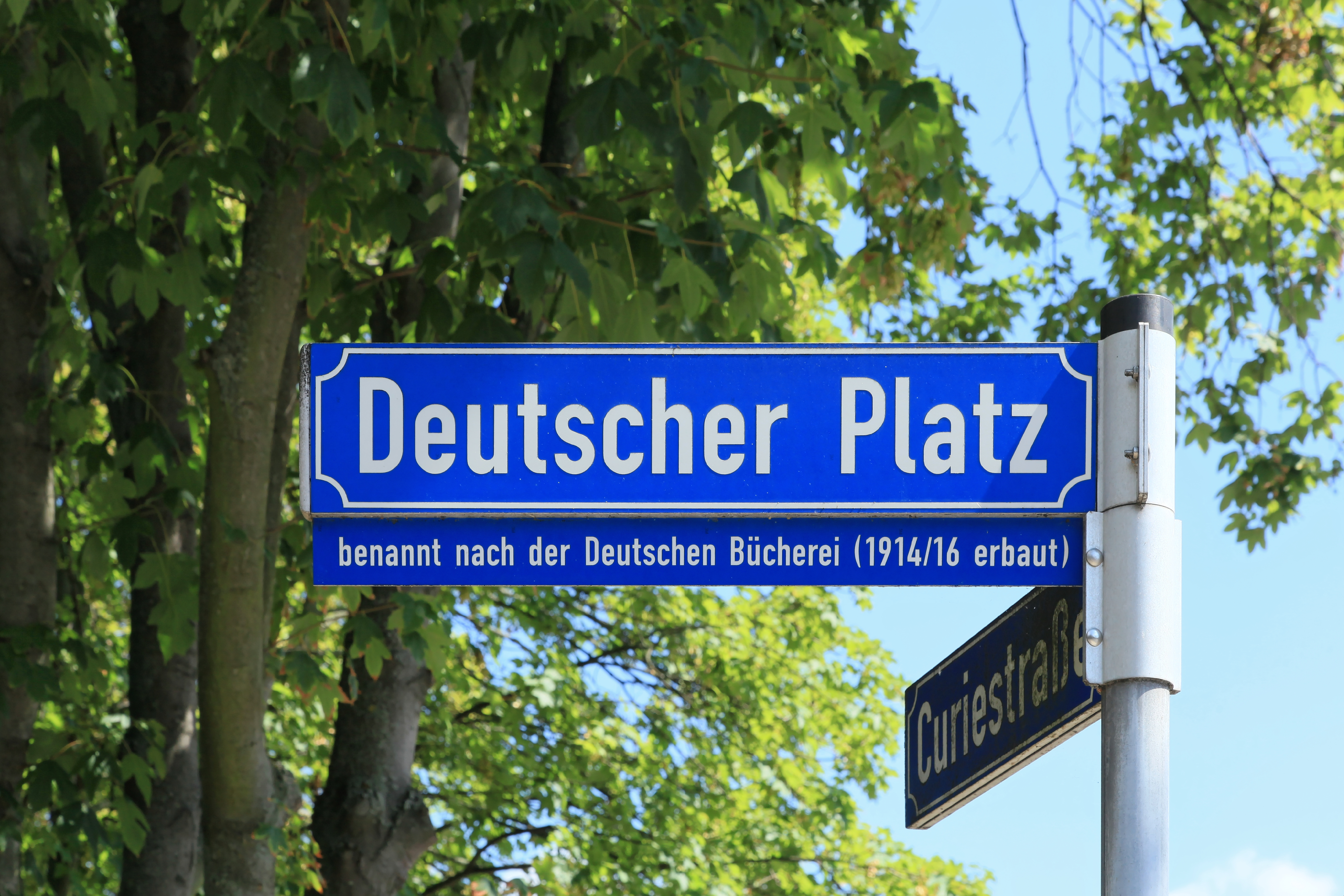
- Street sign Deutscher Platz
- Interactive map of Deutscher Platz
- Length: 200 m (660 ft)
- Width: 90 m (295.3 ft)
- Location: Leipzig-Mitte, Leipzig, Germany
- Postal code: 04103
- Coordinates: 51°19′17.7″N 12°23′44.9″E

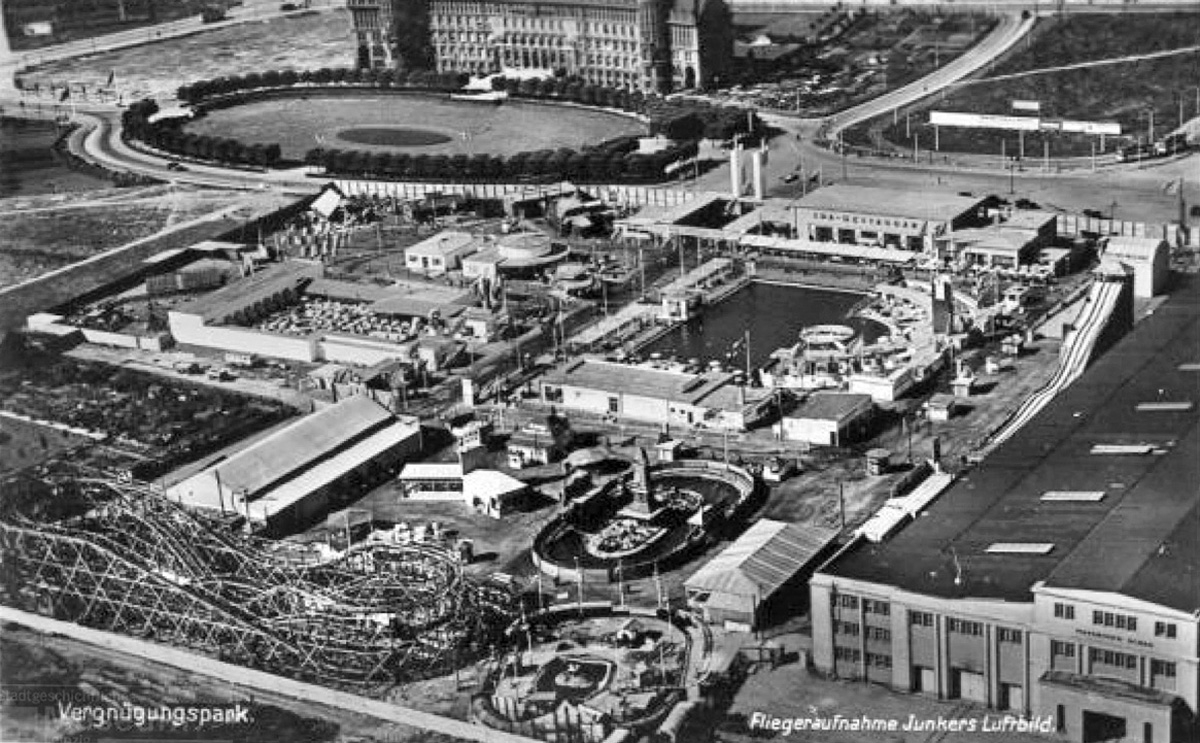
View 1930: The Deutscher Platz at the top of the picture – the first building of the Deutsche Bücherei stands as a solitaire on the square

Deutscher Platz (in English: German Plaza) is a square in Leipzig, Germany. Since 1929 it has been named after the German Library (Deutsche Bücherei), now the German National Library, whose main entrance is located on this square.

== Location and description ==
Deutscher Platz is part of the street of the Strasse des 18. Oktober, which it interrupts for a length of about 200 m (656.2 ft). Together, they form the main urban axis between the city centre and the Monument to the Battle of the Nations. The square has an oval shape. The middle is a meadow about 150 m (492.1 ft) long and 75 m (246.1 ft), which is surrounded by a double row of trees. The lanes run outside. The carriageway in the direction of the city has a special designation as a bicycle boulevard. The development follows the oval shape of the square in a concave shape. At the southeastern end of Deutscher Platz, Curiestrasse runs in from Philipp-Rosenthal-Strasse.

== History ==
The Strasse des 18. Oktober and the square later called Deutsche Platz, as well as the Monument to the Battle of the Nations, were planned and laid out in the run-up to the 100th anniversary of the Battle of the Nations (1913). One of the "curiosities of architectural history" is that the foundation stone for the Deutsche Bücherei, the first building to be erected on Deutscher Platz, was laid elsewhere in 1913 (in Karl-Siegismund-Strasse). However, when the city of Leipzig then made the property at Deutscher Platz available, the construction was replanned accordingly. The Deutscher Platz, which was predetermined by the building, retained its distinctive shape and was the only constant in the changing drafts for the design of the 2.6 kilometres (1.6 mi) long street of the Strasse des 18. Oktober. The latter was essentially not built on until the 1970s. At Deutscher Platz itself, only the German Library was expanded during the GDR period, but a Leipzig Trade Fair centre was not built at this location. Around the turn of the millennium, the scientific institutions described below were added.

== Development ==
Starting on the east side and then continuing clockwise, the following buildings are located on Deutscher Platz:

=== German National Library ===
Conceived as a national library, the Deutsche Bücherei (now the German National Library) has the task of collecting all domestic and foreign German-language literature since 1913. The buildings on Deutscher Platz date from different eras, as the library had to be expanded several times. The building, which was built according to the plans of Oskar Pusch from 1914 to 1916, stands with a concave curved, the 120 m (393.7 ft) long in the arch of Deutscher Platz. The extension from 1934/35 stands at the back, i.e. towards Philipp-Rosenthal-Strasse. It houses the large reading room. At the northern end, i.e. towards Semmelweisstrasse, are the two 55 m (180.4 ft) tall book towers, which were built from 1977 to 1982. The fourth extension (2007 to 2011, architect: Gabriele Glöckler), which is reminiscent of a reclining book, connects the historic building from the imperial era with the book towers from the GDR era. An architectural competition was held in 2025 for the fifth extension, which is to be built at the southern end.

=== Administration building of the Alte Messe ===
The four-storey building, which was completed in 1981 and also has the address "Deutscher Platz", was built over the west entrance to the exhibition grounds. This interrupted the unobstructed view of the Monument to the Battle of the Nations, which was a prerequisite for all planning. The offices located in it are still used in the 2020s.

=== Bio City Leipzig ===
On the other side of the square, the Bio City Leipzig building was completed in 2003 (design: Spengler-Wiescholek architects, Hamburg). With this – and with the Max Planck Institute building – the Deutscher Platz, which had remained a torso until then, was given further shape.

=== Max Planck Institute for Evolutionary Anthropology ===
The building of the Max Planck Institute for Evolutionary Anthropology, also completed in 2003, is the counterpart to the oldest building of the National Library on the other side of the square. It is also concave curved. With its seven storeys, it also reaches the height required for this square (architects: Schmidt-Schicketanz and Partners).

Buildings on Deutscher Platz

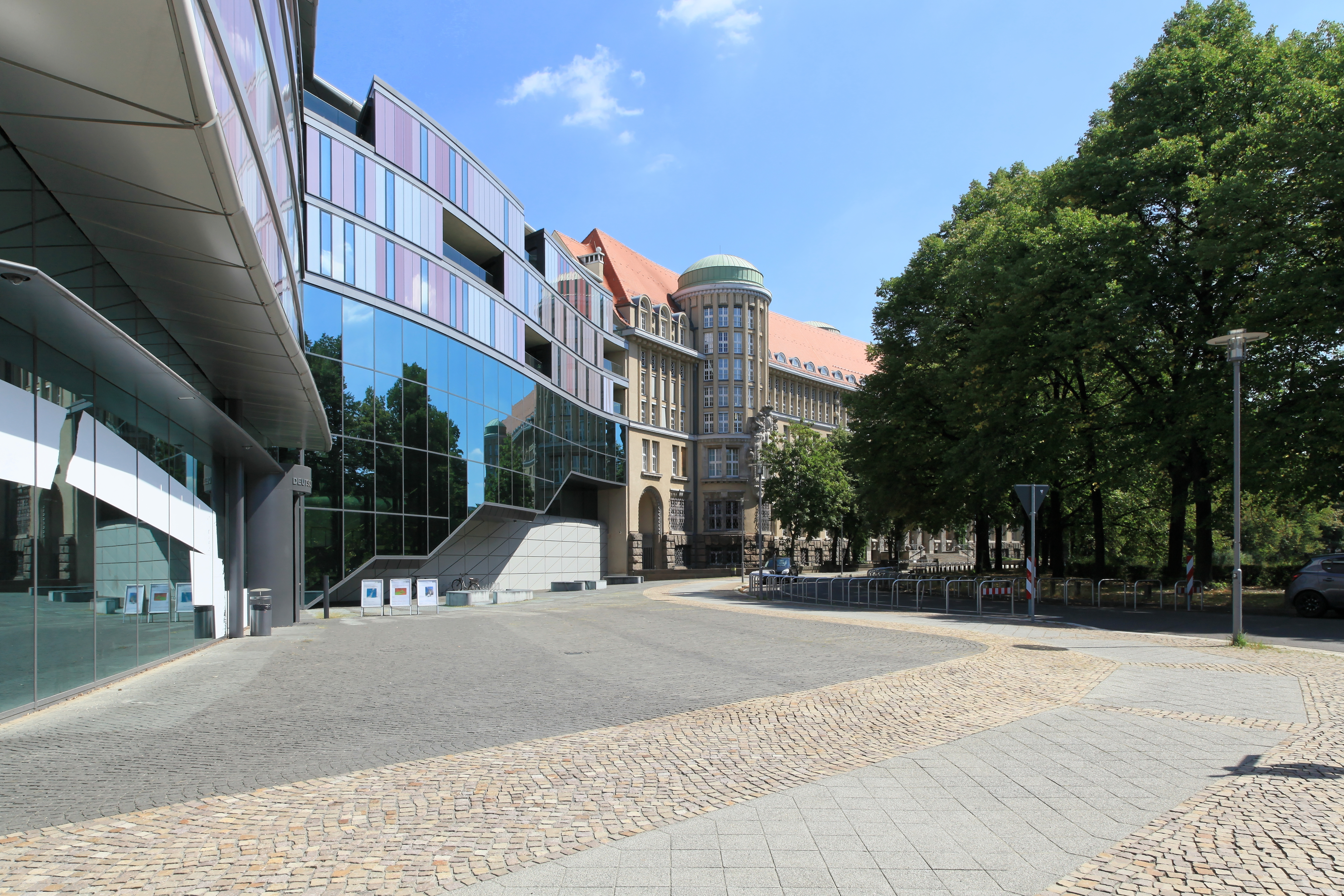
Deutsche Nationalbibliothek (German National Library - 2016)

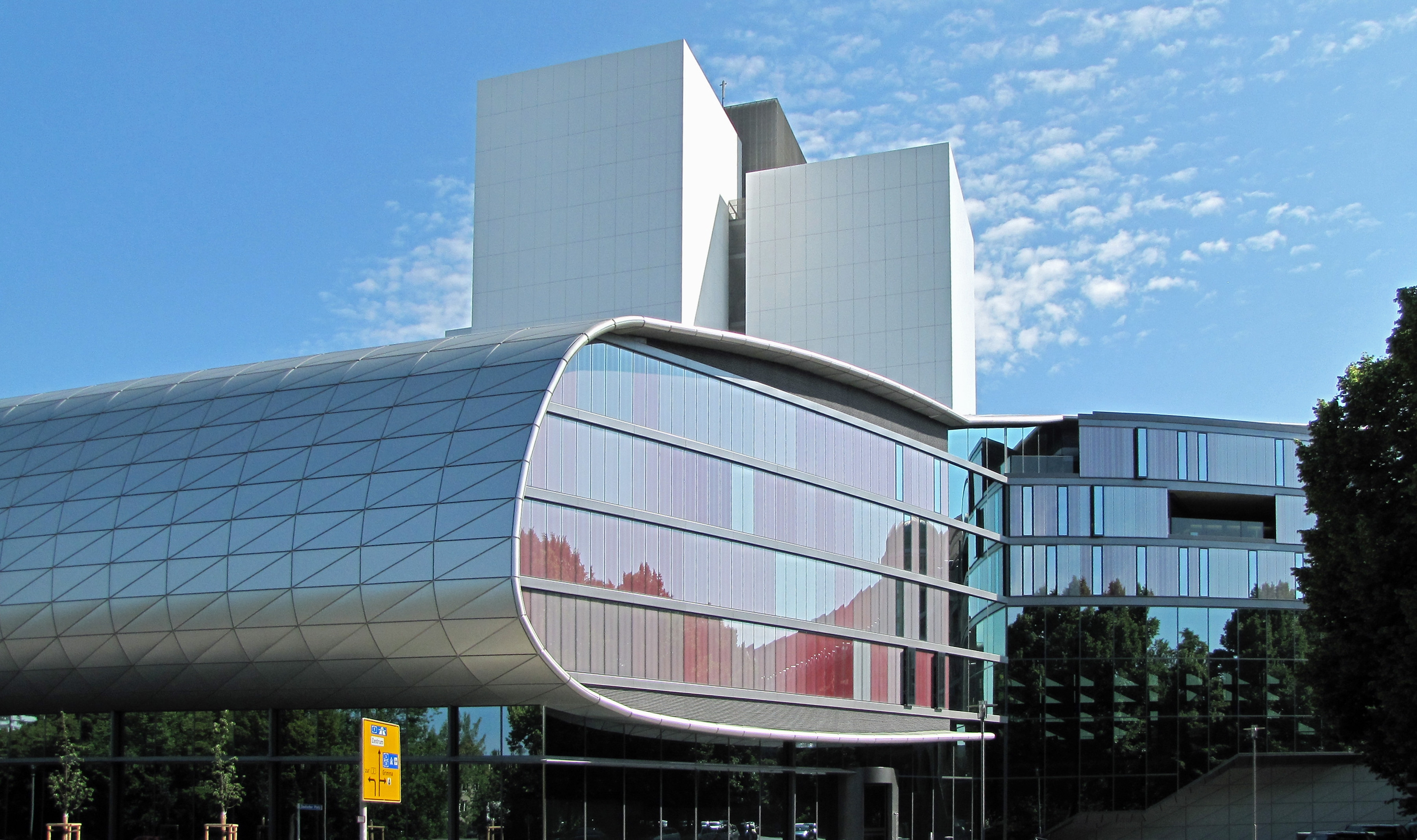
Extension of the library and Book Towers (2011)

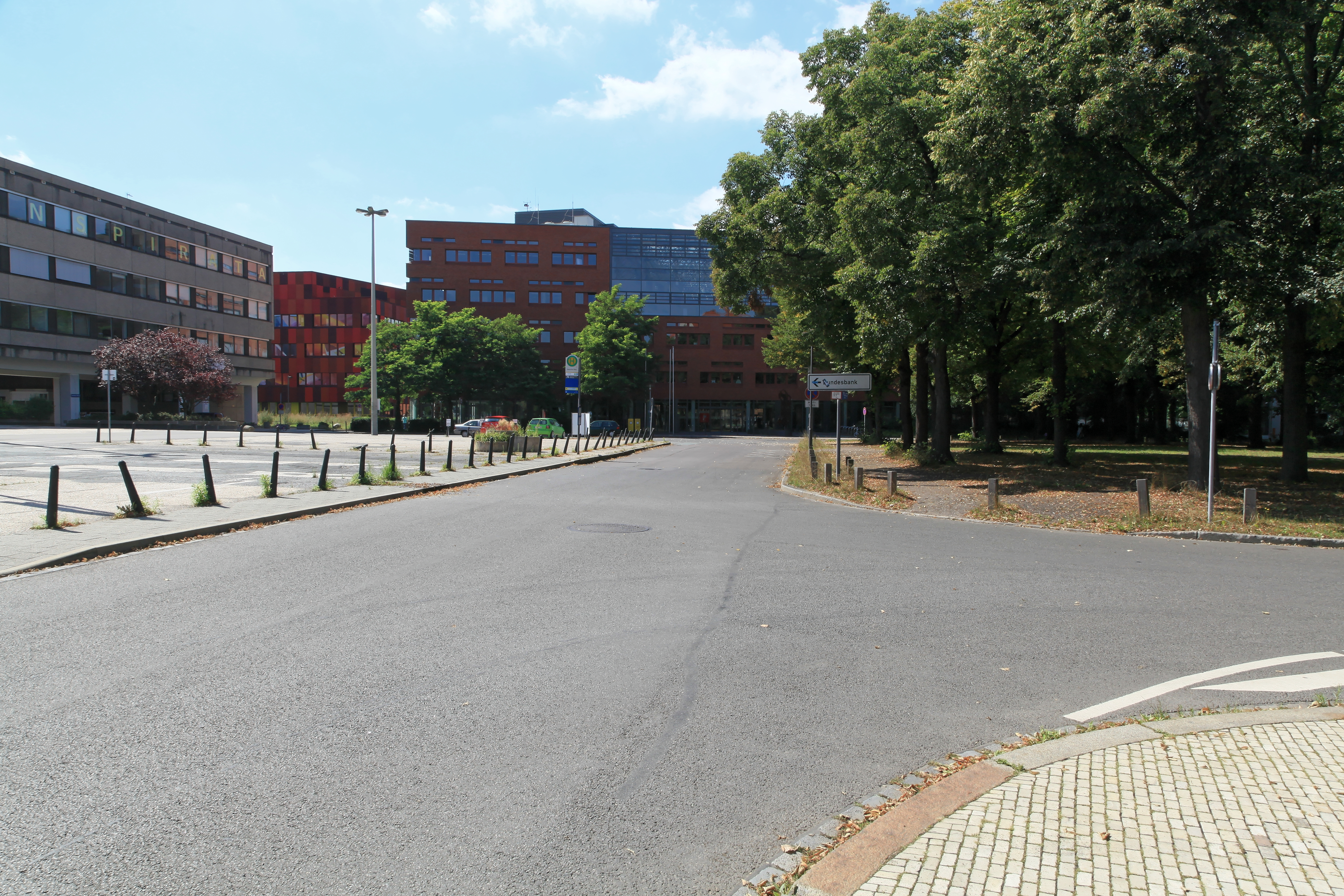
Left: Administration building "Alte Messe", middle: Bio City, in front Curiestraße (2016)

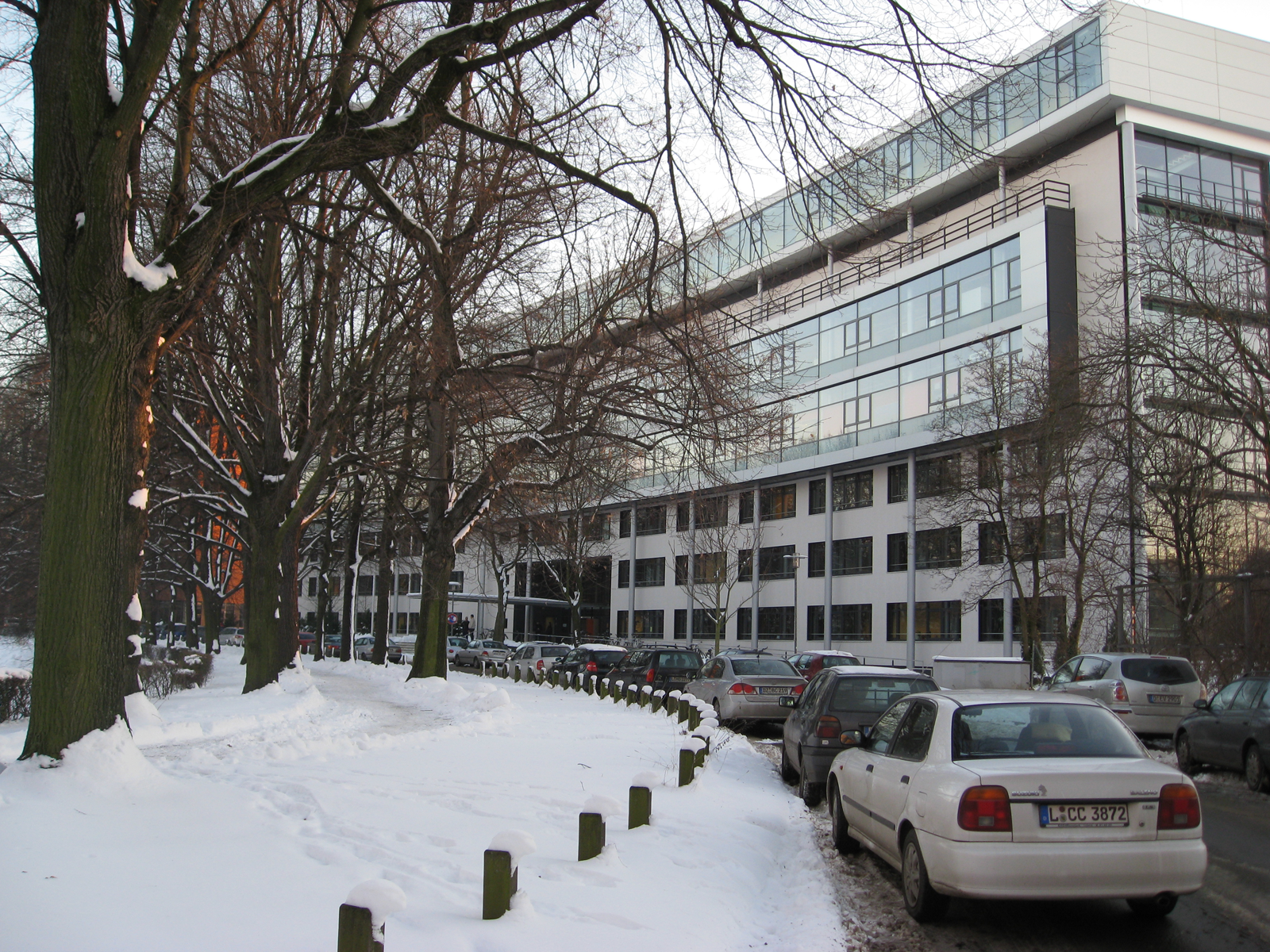
Max Planck Institute for Evolutionary Anthropology (2009)

== Public transport connections ==
The nearest stop is Deutsche Nationalbibliothek (German National Library). Leipzig tram line 16 runs here.

== See also ==
- German Museum of Books and Writing
- German Music Archive
