= Translational Centre for Regenerative Medicine =

German research institute

The Translational Centre for Regenerative Medicine (TRM) was a central scientific institution of the University of Leipzig. It focussed on the development of diagnostic and therapeutic concepts in the field of regenerative medicine and their implementation into a clinical setting.

The TRM Leipzig was established in October 2006 with funds from the Federal Ministry of Education and Research, the Free State of Saxony and the University of Leipzig. It was part of the Life Sciences Network Leipzig and one of the initiators of the Regenerative Medicine Initiative Germany (RMIG).

There is no information available for the TRM after 2020.

== Translation ==
The TRM Leipzig aims to accelerate the translation of laboratory research in therapeutics and diagnostics into the clinic. The centre introduces an organisational process to assure the effective implementation of therapy-oriented gateway research. The foundation of this concept consists of an award system in which three main gates are conceived. Passing the gates precedes the conceptual, preclinical, and clinical working phases each new diagnostic or therapeutic concept has to go through. This enables the TRM Leipzig to ensure an effective translation in conjunction with a comprehensive support and coordination of research projects.

== Research ==
Professor Frank Emmrich led the institute from 2006 to 2015. The scientific work of TRM Leipzig is guided by two boards. The Executive Board provides the strategic direction of research at the TRM. Expertise and scientific support is given by the Internal Advisory Board which includes experts of science, senior scientists, researchers and entrepreneurs. TRM Leipzig promotes application-oriented and interdisciplinary research projects in four areas:

- Tissue Engineering und Materials Science (TEMAT)
- Cell Therapies for Repair and Replacement (CELLT)
- Regulatory Molecules and Delivery Systems (REMOD)
- Imaging, Modelling and Monitoring of Regeneration (IMONIT)

The research areas of the TRM Leipzig are supported by three core units:

- Quality Management Core Unit (QMCU)
- Translational Surgery Core Unit (TSCU)
- Computational Microscopy Core Unit (CMCU)

== Awards ==
The TRM Leipzig selects and funds investigator-initiated translational awards that supports young researchers pursuing their own therapy-oriented concepts and extending their innovation potential. Awards can be requested by individual researchers, scientific groups or tandem research teams consisting of clinicians and researchers. Applications for the awards can be submitted anytime.
