= Bio City Leipzig =

Biotechnology business incubator

Coordinates: 51.3201°N 12.3952°E

- Logo
- Industry: Startup accelerator, biotechnology, life sciences
- Founded: 2003; 23 years ago
- Headquarters: Leipzig, Germany
- Website: www.biocity-campus.com/en/bio-city-leipzig/

Bio City Leipzig in Leipzig is a business incubator in the field of biotechnology. With the start of the "Biotechnology Offensive Saxony" in 2000 and with the concept of uniting business and science under one roof, the foundation stone was laid on 8 February 2002. The opening of the centre took place on 23 May 2003. The total investment volume was €50 million, including €12.9 million from the City of Leipzig. The landlord is LGH - Leipziger Gewerbehof GmbH & Co. KG and tenant management is operated by leap:up GmbH. Until February 2025, leap:up was named biosaxony Management GmbH.

== Science and Economics ==
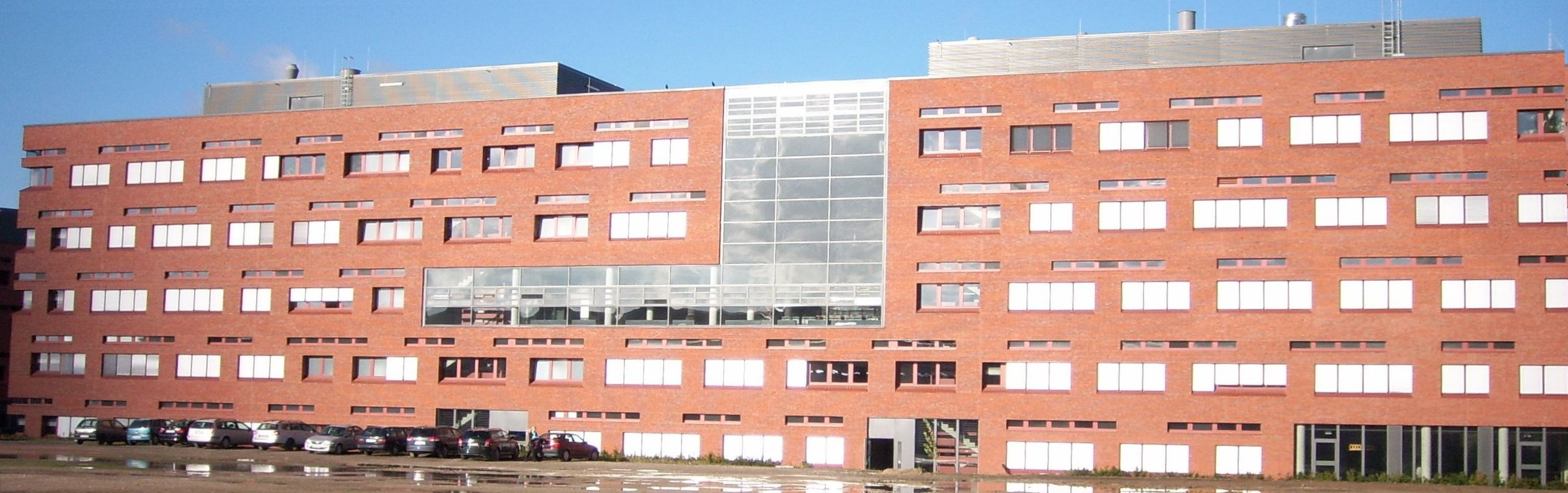
The Bio City Building (2006)

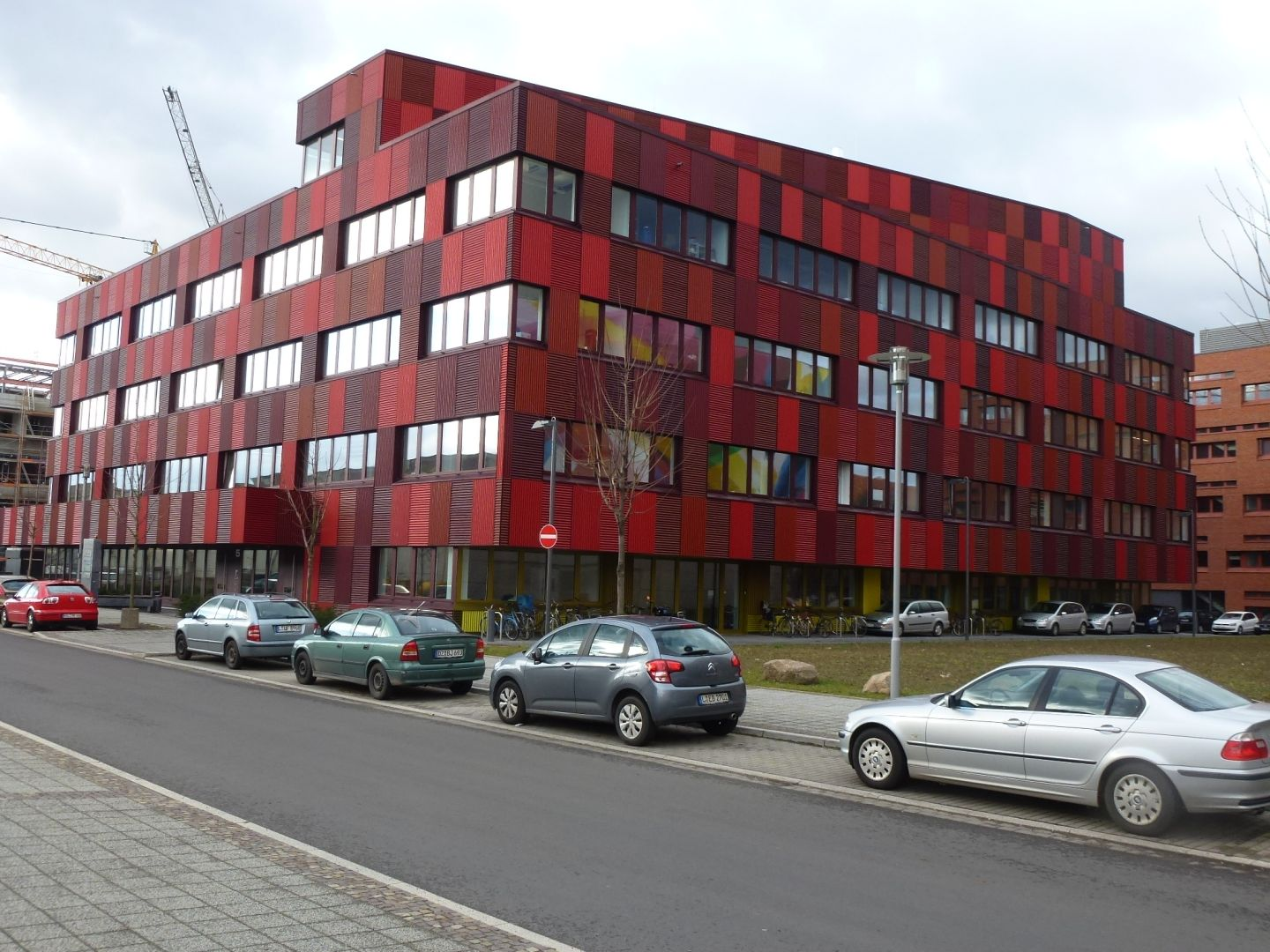
The BioCube Building (2014)

The total area of Bio City Leipzig is 20,000 m^{2} (220,000 sq ft). Three quarters of the area is used by biotechnology companies and founders, the other quarter is available to the Centre for Biotechnology and Biomedicine (BBZ) of the Leipzig University.

The economic and scientific focus of the local companies and the BBZ is particularly in the field of industrial, medical and green biotechnology. Bio City Leipzig, for example, was home to the headquarters of the Vita 34 International and Haema companies, the first one a cord blood bank, the second one a blood donation service.

== Infrastructure ==
Bio City Leipzig is located on Deutscher Platz and is the nucleus of a BioCity Campus with the German Centre for Integrative Biodiversity Research (iDiv) Halle-Jena-Leipzig, the Max Planck Institute for Evolutionary Anthropology, the Fraunhofer Institute for Cell Therapy and Immunology, the Translational Center for Regenerative Medicine Leipzig, Haema, the faculties of natural sciences and the University of Leipzig Medical Center in the immediate vicinity. The Faculty of Veterinary Medicine of the Leipzig University and the German National Library are also located here.

In 2013, an extension building, called "BioCube", was opened with 6,400 m^{2} (69,000 sq ft) of space at a cost of €12.3 million, Vita 34 (new name since February 2025: FamiCord AG) is one of the tenants.

== Architecture ==
The building of the Bio City Leipzig (Architects: Spengler / Wiescholek from Hamburg) was in 2003 awarded the Architekturpreis der Stadt Leipzig (Architecture Award of the City of Leipzig). Spengler / Wiescholek designed also the extension building BioCube. The four-storey building is clad on the outside with a multifaceted metal façade in different shades of red.

Architecture (2025)

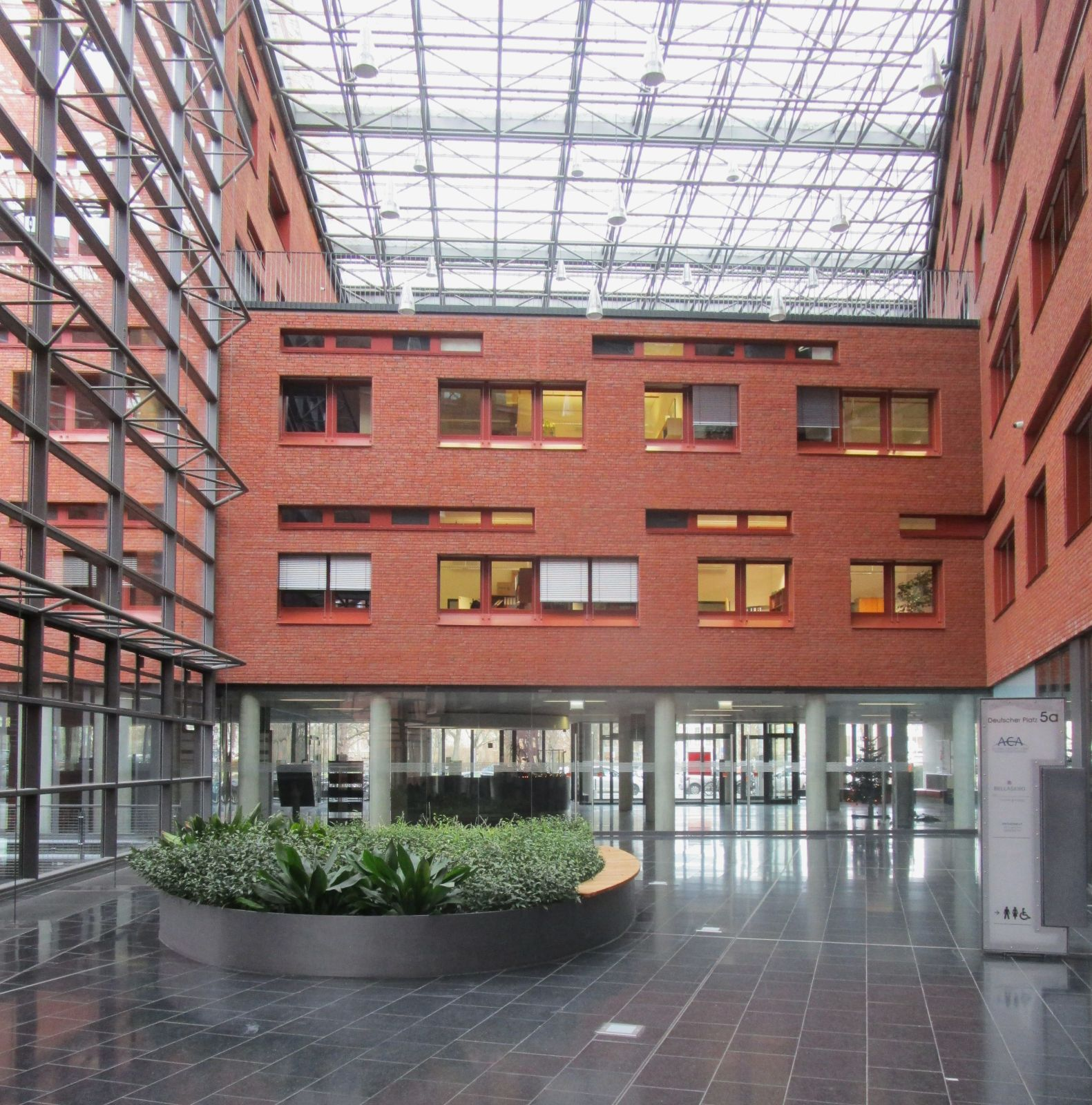
Inside the Bio City Building, view towards the main entrance

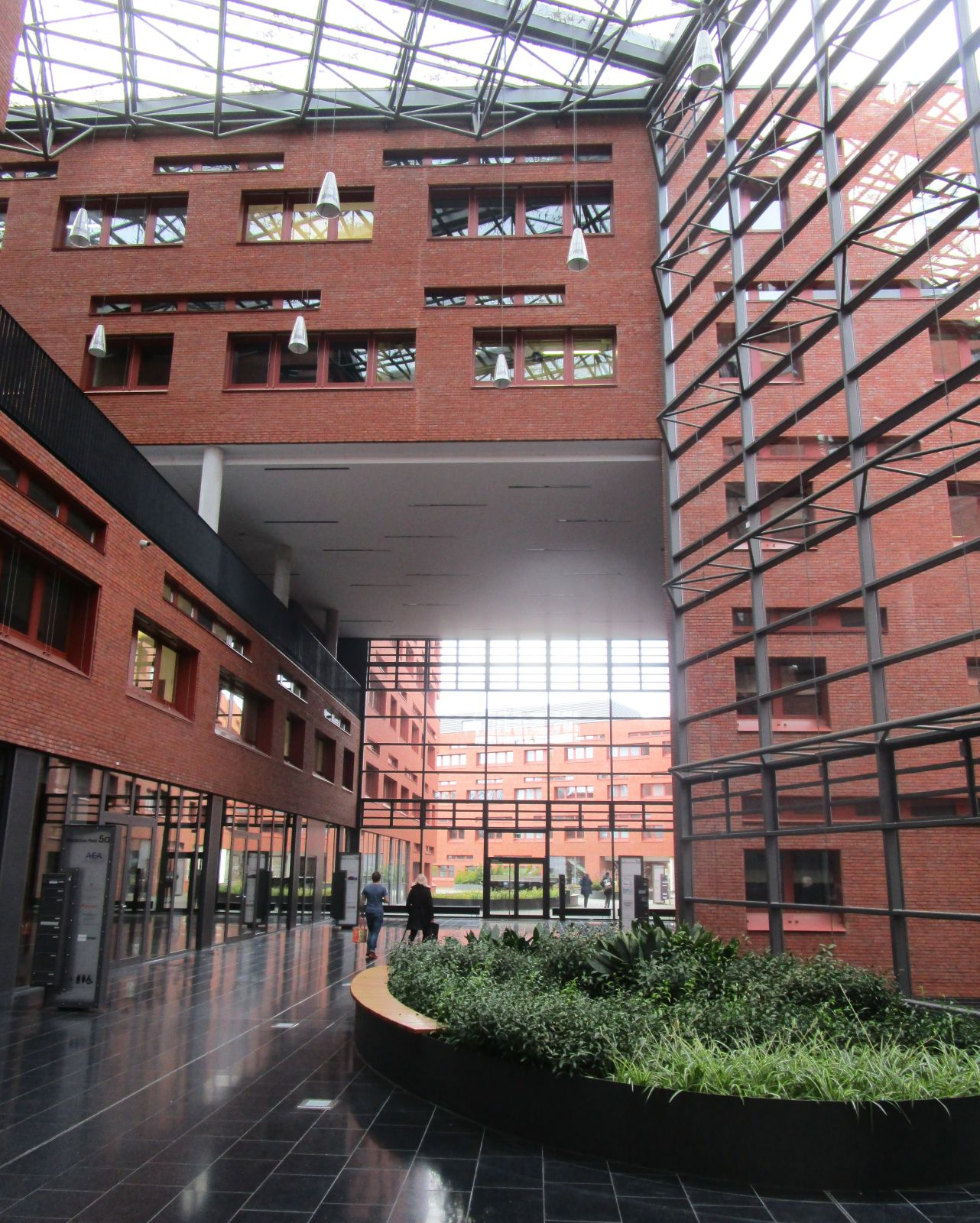
Atrium inside the Bio City Building

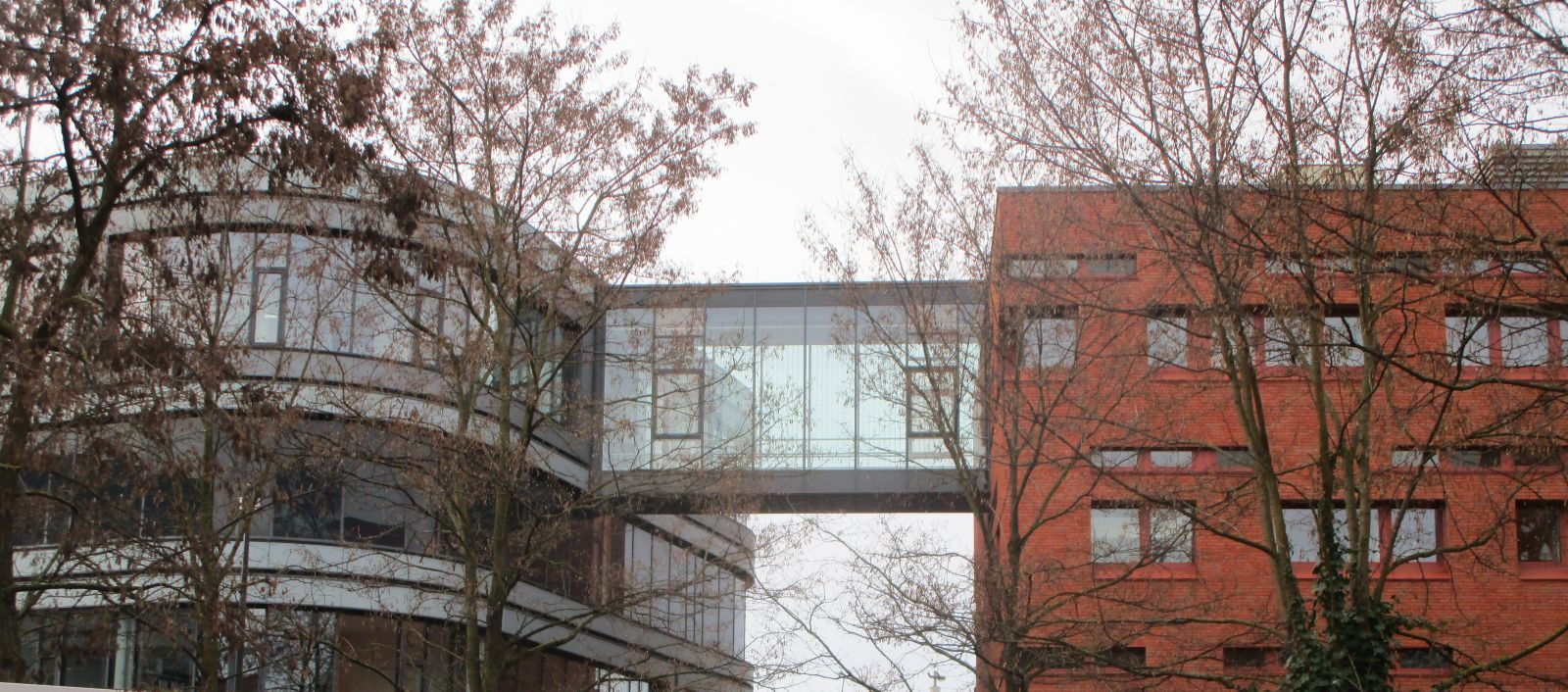
Skyway between the Bio City Building and the Fraunhofer Institute for Cell Therapy and Immunology

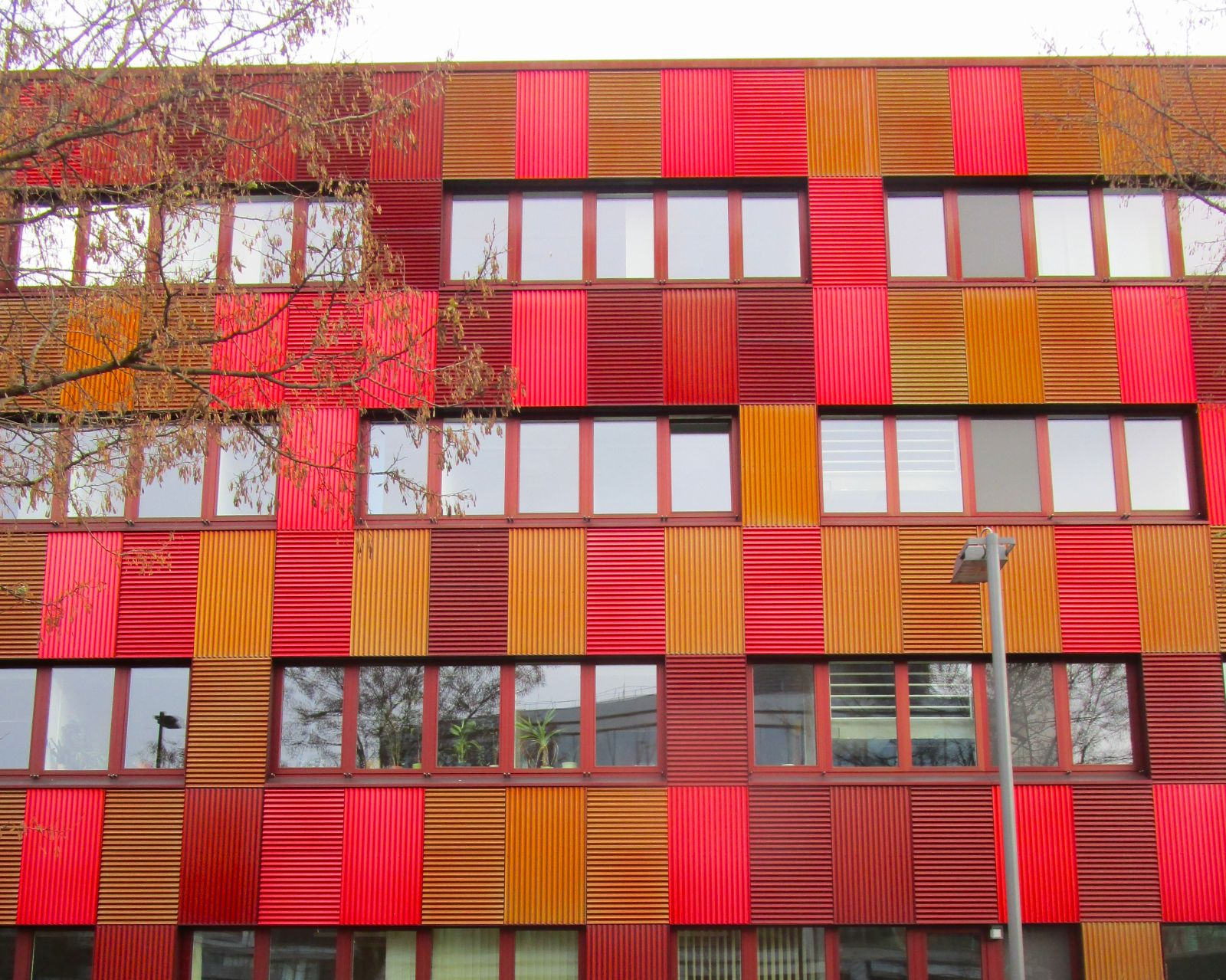
BioCube Building: Façade in different shades of red
