= Leibniz Institute of Plant Genetics and Crop Plant Research =

German plant-genetics research institute and genebank

The Leibniz Institute of Plant Genetics and Crop Plant Research (IPK), in Gatersleben, Saxony-Anhalt, Germany, is a research institute for plant genetics and crop science and a member of the Leibniz Association. It operates the German federal ex situ genebank, one of the largest collections of plant genetic resources in the world.

== Genebank ==
The Gatersleben genebank holds more than 130,000 accessions of crop plants and their wild relatives, making it one of the largest plant genebanks in the world. Its holdings are documented in the Genebank Information System (GBIS), and accessions are numbered with crop-specific prefixes. The Capsicum (pepper) collection, for instance, uses the prefix "CAP" and holds over a thousand accessions, which have featured in large genebank-based studies of pepper diversity.
