= ISRA International Journal of Islamic Finance =

Academic journal in finance

ISRA International Journal of Islamic Finance (IIJIF) is an academic journal publishing research in the fields of Islamic economics and finance. It is published by the International Shari’ah Research Academy for Islamic Finance (ISRA), which has been vested the task to promote applied Shari’ah research in the niche area of Islamic finance. It was renamed to the International Journal of Islamic Finance and Sustainable Development (IJIFSD) in September 2024.

IIJIF has been published since December 2009. It is a fully peer reviewed and refereed journal, aiming at a wider readership interested to learn more about Islamic economics, finance and other relevant disciplines. It aspires to publish original and unpublished work within the areas of, but not limited to, Sharia (Islamic law), Islamic economics, banking, capital markets, takaful (Islamic Insurance), etc.

IIJIF is published semi-annually (in June and December) in both printed and electronic forms. Each issue of IIJIF consists of 4 academic articles, 1 practitioners’ article and 5 research notes.

== Publication details ==
Journal Name: ISRA International Journal of Islamic Finance (IIJIF)

- Publisher: International Shari’ah Research Academy for Islamic Finance (ISRA)
- Copyright: International Shari’ah Research Academy for Islamic Finance (ISRA)
- Frequency of issuance: Semi-annual (in June and December)
- Inaugural Issue: December 2009
- Language: English
- Content: Academic Articles, Practitioner’s Article and Research Notes
- Print-ISSN 0128-1976
- Electronic-ISSN 2289-4365

== International databases ==
ISRA International Journal of Islamic Finance is indexed in:

- EBSCO Products
- EconLit
- EconBiz
- Index Islamicus
- ProQuest
- Scientific Indexing Services
