= List of libraries in Germany =

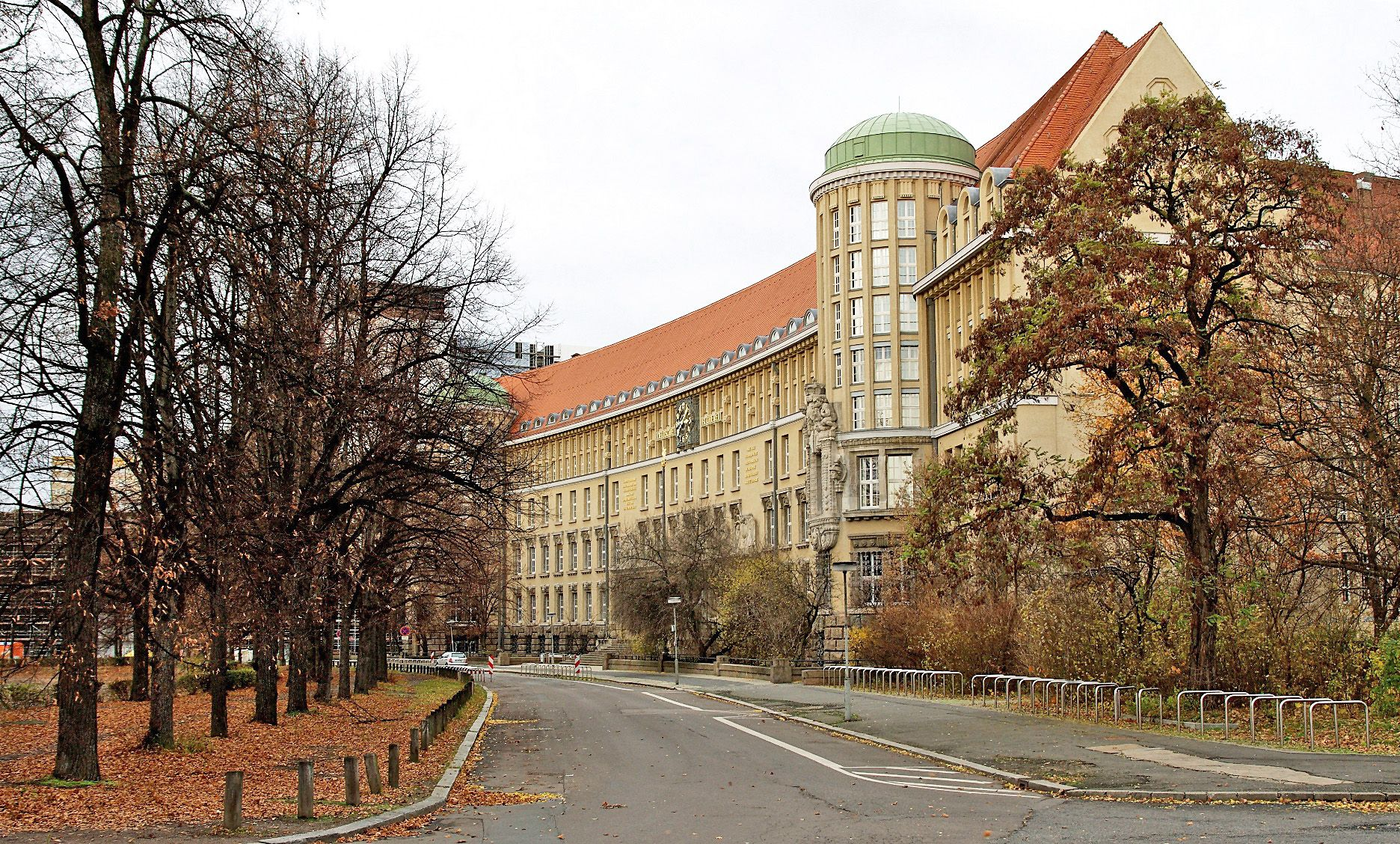
The German National Library (DNB), Leipzig

This is a list of libraries in the Federal Republic of Germany. There is a much more extensive list available on the German Wikipedia. There are about 6,313 public libraries in Germany.

== National Libraries ==
- German National Library (Deutsche Nationalbibliothek; incl. Collection of German Prints (Sammlung Deutscher Drucke)), Frankfurt am Main and Leipzig
- German National Library of Economics (Deutsche Zentralbibliothek für Wirtschaftswissenschaften), Kiel and Hamburg
- German National Library of Medicine (Deutsche Zentralbibliothek für Medizin), Cologne
- German National Library of Science and Technology (Technische Informationsbibliothek), Hanover

== State and regional libraries ==
- Baden State Library (Badische Landesbibliothek), Karlsruhe
- Bamberg State Library (Staatsbibliothek Bamberg), Bamberg
- Bavarian State Library (Bayerische Staatsbibliothek), Munich
- Berlin State Library (Staatsbibliothek zu Berlin), Berlin
- Berlin Central and Regional Library, the library for the city and state of Berlin
- Darmstadt University and State Library (Universitäts- und Landesbibliothek Darmstadt), Darmstadt
- Düsseldorf University and State Library (Universitäts- und Landesbibliothek Düsseldorf), Düsseldorf
- Göttingen State and University Library (Niedersächsische Staats- und Universitätsbibliothek Göttingen), Göttingen
- Prussian Heritage Image Archive (Bildarchiv Preußischer Kulturbesitz), Berlin
- Saarland University and State Library (Saarländische Universitäts- und Landesbibliothek), Saarland
- Saxon State Library (Sächsische Landesbibliothek), Dresden
- Württemberg State Library (Württembergische Landesbibliothek), Stuttgart

== City libraries ==
- Braunschweig Public Library (Stadtbibliothek Braunschweig), Braunschweig
- Cologne Public Library (StadtBibliothek Köln), Cologne
- Stuttgart Public Library (Stadtbücherei Stuttgart), Stuttgart
- Berlin City Library (Stadtbibliothek Berlin), Berlin

=== List of City Libraries in Rhineland-Palatinate ===
- Koblenz City Library (Stadtbibliothek Koblenz), Koblenz
  - Central Library (Zentralbibliothek Koblenz)
  - Koblenz-Horchheim District Library (Stadtteilbücherei Horchheim)
  - Koblenz-Karthause District Library (Stadtteilbücherei Karthause)
  - Koblenz-Pfaffendorfer-Höhe District Library (Stadtteilbücherei Pfaffendorfer-Höhe)
- Ludwigshafen City Library (Stadtbibliothek Ludwigshafen), Ludwigshafen
- Mainz City Library (Stadtbibliothek Mainz), Mainz
- Trier Public Library (Stadtbibliothek Trier), Trier
- Worms City Library (Stadtbibliothek Worms), Worms

== Specialized libraries ==
- American Memorial Library (Amerika-Gedenkbibliothek), Berlin
- Berlin Art Library (Kunstbibliothek Berlin), part of the Berlin State Museums
- Deutsche Fotothek, a picture library in Dresden, Saxony
- Duchess Anna Amalia Library, Weimar, Thuringia
- Gottfried Wilhelm Leibniz Bibliothek, Hanover
- German Esperanto Library, Aalen, Baden-Württemberg
- German Central Library for the Blind (Deutsche Zentralbücherei für Blinde), Leipzig
- Gotha Research Library (Forschungsbibliothek Gotha), Gotha, Thuringia
- Herzog August Library, Wolfenbüttel, Lower Saxony
- Library of Friedrich Nietzsche (Nietzsche-Archiv), Weimar, Thuringia
- Lippe State Library, Detmold, North Rhine-Westphalia
- Monacensia, Munich, Bavaria
- Phantastische Bibliothek Wetzlar, Wetzlar, Hesse
- Philatelic Library Hamburg (Philatelistische Bibliothek), Hamburg
- UNESCO Institute for Lifelong Learning Library, Hamburg
- Virtual Library of Musicology (Virtuelle Fachbibliothek Musikwissenschaft), Munich, Bavaria
- West German Library for the Blind (Westdeutsche Blindenhörbücherei), Münster, North Rhine-Westphalia
- Zeno.org, a German digital library

== University libraries ==
- Augsburg University Library (Universitätsbibliothek Augsburg), Augsburg
- Bamberg University Library (Universitätsbibliothek Bamberg), Bamberg
- Bonn University Library (Universitätsbibliothek Bonn), Bonn
- Braunschweig University Library (Universitätsbibliothek Braunschweig), Braunschweig
- Darmstadt University and State Library (Universitäts- und Landesbibliothek Darmstadt), Darmstadt
- Düsseldorf University and State Library (Universitäts- und Landesbibliothek Düsseldorf), Düsseldorf
- Frankfurt University Library (Universitätsbibliothek Frankfurt am Main), Frankfurt
- Freiburg University Library (Universitätsbibliothek Freiburg), Freiburg
- Göttingen State and University Library (Niedersächsische Staats- und Universitätsbibliothek Göttingen), Göttingen
- Greifswald University Library (Universitätsbibliothek Greifswald), Greifswald
- Heidelberg University Library (Universitätsbibliothek Heidelberg), Heidelberg
- Hamburg University Library (Universitätsbibliothek der Universität Hamburg), Hamburg
- Hanover University Library (Universitätsbibliothek Hannover), Hannover
- Kaiserlautern University Library (Universitätsbibliothek Kaiserlautern), Kaiserlautern
- KIT Library (Universitätsbibliothek Karlsruhe), Karlsruhe
- Kassel University Library (Universitätsbibliothek Kassel), Kassel
- Koblenz-Landau University Library (Universitätsbibliothek Koblenz-Landau), Koblenz and Landau
- Leipzig University Library (Universitätsbibliothek Leipzig), Leipzig
- Ludwigshafen University Library (Hochschulbibliothek Ludwigshafen), Ludwigshafen
- Mainz University Library (Universitätsbibliothek Mainz), Mainz
- Mannheim University Library (Universitätsbibliothek Mannheim), Mannheim
- Philological Library (Philologische Bibliothek) of the Free University of Berlin
- Potsdam University Library (Universitätsbibliothek Potsdam), Potsdam
- PsyDok, a digital Psychology library supported by Saarland University, Saarland
- Saarland University and State Library (Saarländische Universitäts- und Landesbibliothek), Saarland
- Stuttgart University Library (Universitätsbibliothek Stuttgart), Stuttgart
- Tübingen University Library (Universitätsbibliothek Tübingen), Tübingen
- Ulm University Library (Universitätsbibliothek Ulm), Ulm
- Wuppertal University Library (Universitätsbibliothek Wuppertal), Wuppertal

== German libraries abroad ==
- Kunsthistorisches Institut in Florenz, Florence, Italy
- Bibliotheca Hertziana – Max Planck Institute for Art History, Rome, Italy
- German Historical Institute Library, Rome, Italy
- German Historical Institute Library, Paris, France
- German Historical Institute Library, London, England
- German Historical Institute Library, Washington, D.C., USA
- German Historical Institute Library, Warsaw, Poland
- German Historical Institute Library, Moscow, Russia
- Goethe-Institut libraries (95 locations)

== Former libraries in Germany ==
- Bibliotheca Palatina, the most important library of the German Renaissance, Heidelberg
- Berlin Singakademie Library, looted in 1945 and as of 2000 temporarily housed at the Berlin State Library
- Königsberg Public Library in Königsberg, East Prussia
- Königsberg State and University Library in Königsberg, East Prussia

== Library associations ==
- International Association of Technological University Libraries, Düsseldorf
- Verein Deutscher Bibliothekarinnen und Bibliothekare (est. 1900)

== See also ==
- Books in Germany
- List of archives in Germany
- List of libraries in Hamburg
- Open access in Germany to scholarly communication
- Adjacent countries
  - List of libraries in Austria
  - List of libraries in Belgium
  - List of libraries in France
  - List of libraries in the Netherlands
  - List of libraries in Switzerland
