= Institute for Scientific and Technical Information =

Institute for Scientific and Technical Information may refer to:

- All Union Institute for Scientific and Technical Information
- Canada Institute for Scientific and Technical Information (NRC-CISTI)
- Institut de l'information scientifique et technique, French National Centre for Scientific Research (INIST-CNRS)
- International Council for Scientific and Technical Information
