= DataCite =

International not-for-profit organization which aims to improve data citation

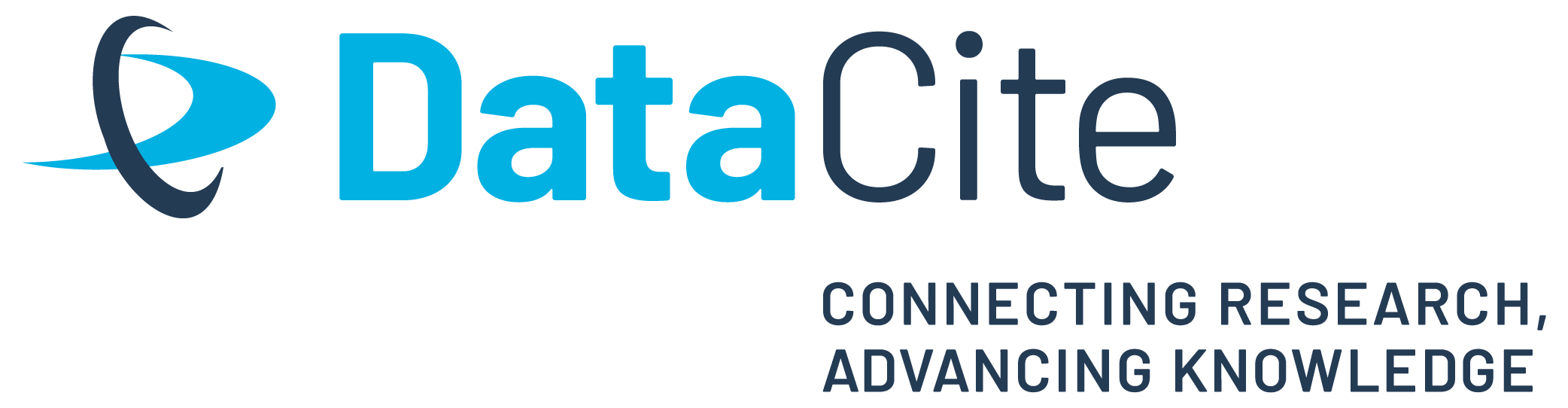
DataCite's logo

DataCite is an international not-for-profit organization which aims to improve data citation in order to:

- establish easier access to research data on the Internet
- increase acceptance of research data as legitimate, citable contributions to the scholarly record
- support data archiving that will permit results to be verified and re-purposed for future study.

== History ==
In August 2009 a paper was published laying out an approach for a global registration agency for research data. DataCite was subsequently founded in London on 1 December 2009 by organisations from 6 countries: the British Library; the Technical Information Center of Denmark (DTIC); the TU Delft Library from the Netherlands; the National Research Council’s Canada Institute for Scientific and Technical Information (NRC-CISTI); the California Digital Library (University of California Curation Center - UC3); Purdue University (USA); and the German National Library of Science and Technology (TIB).

After the founding of DataCite, leading research libraries and information centres converged for the first official members’ convention in Paris on 5 February 2010. The inclusion of five further members was approved in the office of the International Council for Science (ICSU): Australian National Data Service (ANDS); Deutsche Zentralbibliothek für Medizin (ZB MED); GESIS – Leibniz Institute for the Social Sciences; French Institute for Scientific and Technical Information (INIST); and Eidgenössische Technische Hochschule (ETH) Zürich.

== Technical ==
The primary means of establishing easier access to research data is by DataCite members assigning persistent identifiers, such as digital object identifiers (DOIs), to data sets. Although currently leveraging the well-established DOI infrastructure, DataCite takes an open approach to identifiers, and considers other systems and services that help forward its objectives.

DataCite's recommended format for a data citation is:

- Creator (PublicationYear): Title. Publisher. Identifier

Or alternatively:

- Creator (PublicationYear): Title. Version. Publisher. ResourceType. Identifier

DataCite recommends that DOI names are displayed as linkable, permanent URLs.

DataCite's metadata, which follows the RDF model, can include information about a data resource's subject, funder, an accompanying abstract, and other information. For contributors to a dataset, one can indicate whether they are a researcher, data collector, data manager, editor, translator, producer, sponsor, or several other roles.

Third-party tools allow the migration of content to and from other services, such as ODIN for ORCID.

== Members ==
- Australia:
  - Australian National Data Service - ANDS
- Canada:
  - National Research Council Canada - NRC-CNRC
- China:
  - Beijing Genomics Institute - BGI
- Denmark:
  - Danish e-Infrastructure Cooperation - DeiC
- Estonia:
  - University of Tartu (/UT)
- Finland:
  - CSC – IT Center for Science - CSC
- France:
  - Institut de l'information scientifique et technique - INIST-CNRS
- Germany:
  - German National Library of Economics - ZBW
  - German National Library of Medicine - ZB MED
  - German National Library of Science and Technology - TIB
  - Leibniz Institute for the Social Sciences - GESIS
  - Göttingen State and University Library - SUB
  - Gesellschaft für wissenschaftliche Datenverarbeitung mbH Göttingen - GWDG
- Hungary:
  - Library and Information Centre, Hungarian Academy of Sciences - MTA KIK
- International:
  - ICSU World Data System - ICSU-WDS
- Italy:
  - Conference of Italian University Rectors - CRUI
- Japan:
  - Japan Link Center - JaLC
- Netherlands:
  - TU Delft Library
- Norway:
  - BIBSYS
- Republic of Korea:
  - Korea Institute of Science and Technology Information - KISTI
- Russia
  - Cyberleninka
  - Russian Agency for Digital Standardization
- South Africa:
  - South African Environmental Observation Network - SAEON
- Sweden:
  - Swedish National Data Service - SND
- Switzerland:
  - CERN - European Organization for Nuclear Research
  - Swiss Federal Institute of Technology Zurich - ETH
- Thailand:
  - National Research Council of Thailand - NRCT
- United Kingdom:
  - The British Library - BL
  - Digital Curation Centre
- United States:
  - California Digital Library - CDL
  - Office of Scientific and Technical Information, US Department of Energy - OSTI
  - Purdue University Libraries - PUL
  - Inter-university Consortium for Political and Social Research - ICPSR
  - Harvard University Library
  - Institute of Electrical and Electronics Engineers - IEEE
  - Open Knowledgebase of Interatomic Models - KIM
  - United States Geological Survey - USGS
  - University of Southern California - USC

== Other partners ==
In April 2017, DataCite was one of the founding partners in the Initiative for Open Citations. In January 2023, DataCite announced a partnership with the Chan Zuckerberg Initiative and the Wellcome Trust to develop an Open Global Data Citation Corpus.
