= Open access in Germany =

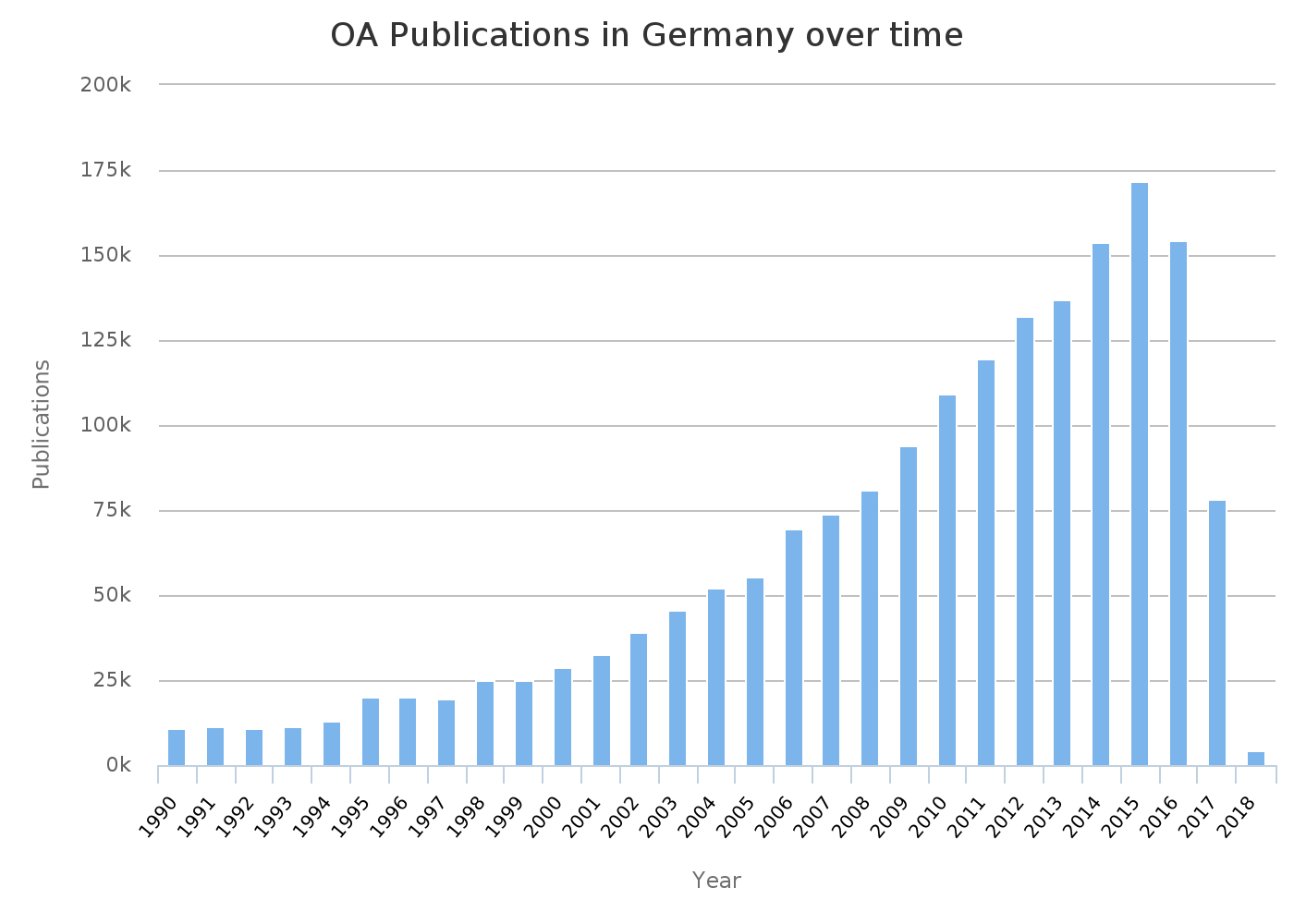
Growth of open access publications in Germany, 1990–2018

Open access to scholarly communication in Germany has evolved rapidly since the early 2000s. Publishers Beilstein-Institut, Copernicus Publications, De Gruyter, Knowledge Unlatched, Leibniz Institute for Psychology Information, ScienceOpen, Springer Nature, and Universitätsverlag Göttingen belong to the international Open Access Scholarly Publishers Association.

== Policy ==
The legal basis for authors choosing open access publishing lies in Section 12 of the German Urheberrechtsgesetz (Copyright Act), which covers Urheberrecht (authors' rights).

All major German research institutions have signed the 2003 Berlin Declaration on Open Access to Knowledge in the Sciences and Humanities, including the Berlin-Brandenburg Academy of Sciences and Humanities, Deutsche Forschungsgemeinschaft, Deutsche Initiative für Netzwerkinformation, Fraunhofer Society, German Rectors' Conference, and Max Planck Society.

"The Federal Ministry of Education and Research released its open access strategy paper entitled "Open Access in Germany" on September 20, 2016, which contains a clear commitment to the principles of open access and open science.

== Journals ==
Open access journals can be found on digital platforms such as Copernicus Publications (headquartered in Göttingen), Digital Peer Publishing, German Medical Science, and Living Reviews.

== Repositories ==
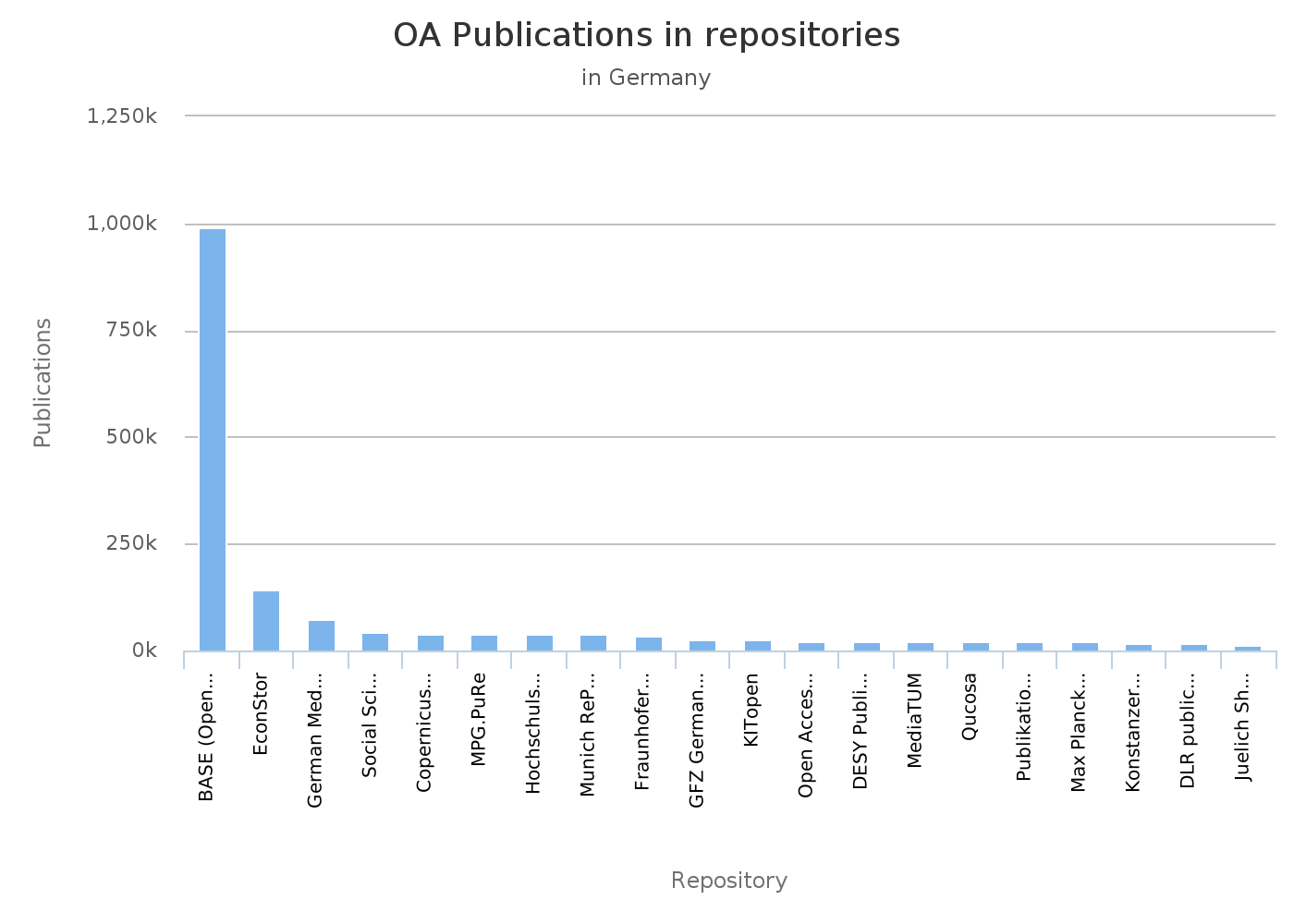
Number of open access publications in various German repositories, 2018

There are a number of collections of scholarship in Germany housed in digital open access repositories. They contain journal articles, book chapters, data, and other research outputs that are free to read. As of March 2018 some 161 institutions in Germany maintain repositories, according to the UK-based Directory of Open Access Repositories.

Listings of German repositories can be found in the Germany-based registries Bielefeld Academic Search Engine (BASE) and Deutsche Initiative für Netzwerkinformation (DINI), and in international registries Directory of Open Access Repositories (OpenDOAR), Registry of Open Access Repositories (ROAR), and Open Archives Initiative's OAI-PMH Registered Data Providers. Experts consider BASE the most comprehensive registry for Germany.

In 2012, German repositories with the highest number of digital assets were Deutsches Zentrum für Luft- und Raumfahrt's elib (46,136 items); ZBW – Leibniz-Informationszentrum Wirtschaft's EconStor (290,000 items); German Medical Science (41,753 items); Bielefeld University's PUB (32,695 items); and Alfred-Wegener-Institut's ePIC (29,480 items). "Most of Germany's open access repositories can be found in the most heavily populated Länder: North Rhine-Westphalia (27), Baden-Württemberg (28) and Bavaria (22)."

The upcoming 2019 "International Conference on Open Repositories" will be held in Hamburg.

== Conferences and outreach ==
Since the initial Berlin conference in 2003, follow-up conferences occur every year, often in Germany.

"Open-Access-Tage" (Open Access Days) have occurred annually since 2007 in various German-speaking locales, including Berlin, Dresden, Göttingen, Hamburg, Köln, Konstanz, Munich, Regensburg. The 2018 event will be held in Graz, Austria.

In 2007 several German institutions launched the general information website, "Open-access.net". The Allianz der Wissenschaftsorganisationen in 2008 initiated an effort to expand open access in order to "exhaust the potential of digital publishing."

Bielefeld University Library hosts the "Transparent Infrastructure for Article Charges" project, which covers article processing charges for publications of Germany and elsewhere. The project began around 2014.

== Timeline ==
Key events in the development of open access in Germany include the following:

- 2001
  - 16 March: German Wikipedia, a German-language open educational resource, begins publication.
- 2003
  - Berlin Declaration on Open Access to Knowledge in the Sciences and Humanities issued.
- 2004
  - Bielefeld Academic Search Engine launched.
  - Aktionsbündnis Urheberrecht für Bildung und Wissenschaft (Coalition for Action "Copyright for Education and Research") formed.
- 2005
  - Bielefeld University begins its open access policy encouraging deposits in its institutional repository.
- 2006
  - Deutsche Forschungsgemeinschaft adopts open access policy for its grantees.
- 2007
  - Open-access.net launched.
  - "Open-Access-Tage" (Open Access Days) begin.
- 2008
  - Allianz der Wissenschaftsorganisationen's Schwerpunktinitiative "Digitale Information" (Priority Initiative "Digital Information") begins.
- 2010
  - Confederation of Open Access Repositories headquartered in Göttingen.
- 2011
  - Deutsche Forschungsgemeinschaft begins "to support centrally funded publication fees through its 'Open-Access Publishing' programme."
- 2012
  - Deutsche Initiative für Netzwerkinformation (DINI) begins.
- 2013
  - Registry of Research Data Repositories headquartered in Germany.
- 2014
  - "Transparent Infrastructure for Article Charges" project begins (approximate date).
- 2015
  - Berlin-based Springer Nature, "the world's second largest academic publisher," in business. As of 2018 "open-access journals generate roughly 10 per cent of Springer Nature's research revenues."

== See also ==
- Internet in Germany
- Education in Germany
- Media of Germany
- Copyright law of Germany
- List of libraries in Germany
- Science and technology in Germany
- Open access in other countries
