= Wirtschaftsdienst =

- Discipline: Economics
- Language: German
- Edited by: Nicole Waidlein

Publication details
- History: 1916–present
- Publisher: sciendo
- Frequency: Monthly

Standard abbreviations
- ISO 4: Wirtschaftsdienst

Indexing
- ISSN: 0043-6275 (print); 1613-978X (web)
- OCLC no.: 7083456

Links
- Journal homepage; Journal page at Springer website

Wirtschaftsdienst – Zeitschrift für Wirtschaftspolitik (English: Economics Review – Journal of Economic Policy) is a peer-reviewed academic journal covering economic and social policy issues in Germany or affecting Germany. It also publishes topics of the European Union in the fields of trade, econometrics, environment, and monetary policy. The editor-in-chief is Dr. Nicole Waidlein. The journal is an official publication of the German National Library of Economics (ZBW). It was established in 1916 and is one of the oldest academic economics journals.

== History ==
Wirtschaftsdienst was established in 1916 at the Hamburg Institute of International Economics (HWWA) in collaboration with the Kiel Institute for the World Economy and Kiel University. In 2007, the HWWA was merged with the ZBW with the aim of making the journal a leading forum for research-based discussions of major German and European economic policy issues.

== See also ==
- Intereconomics
