= Daniel Gros =

German economist (born 1955)

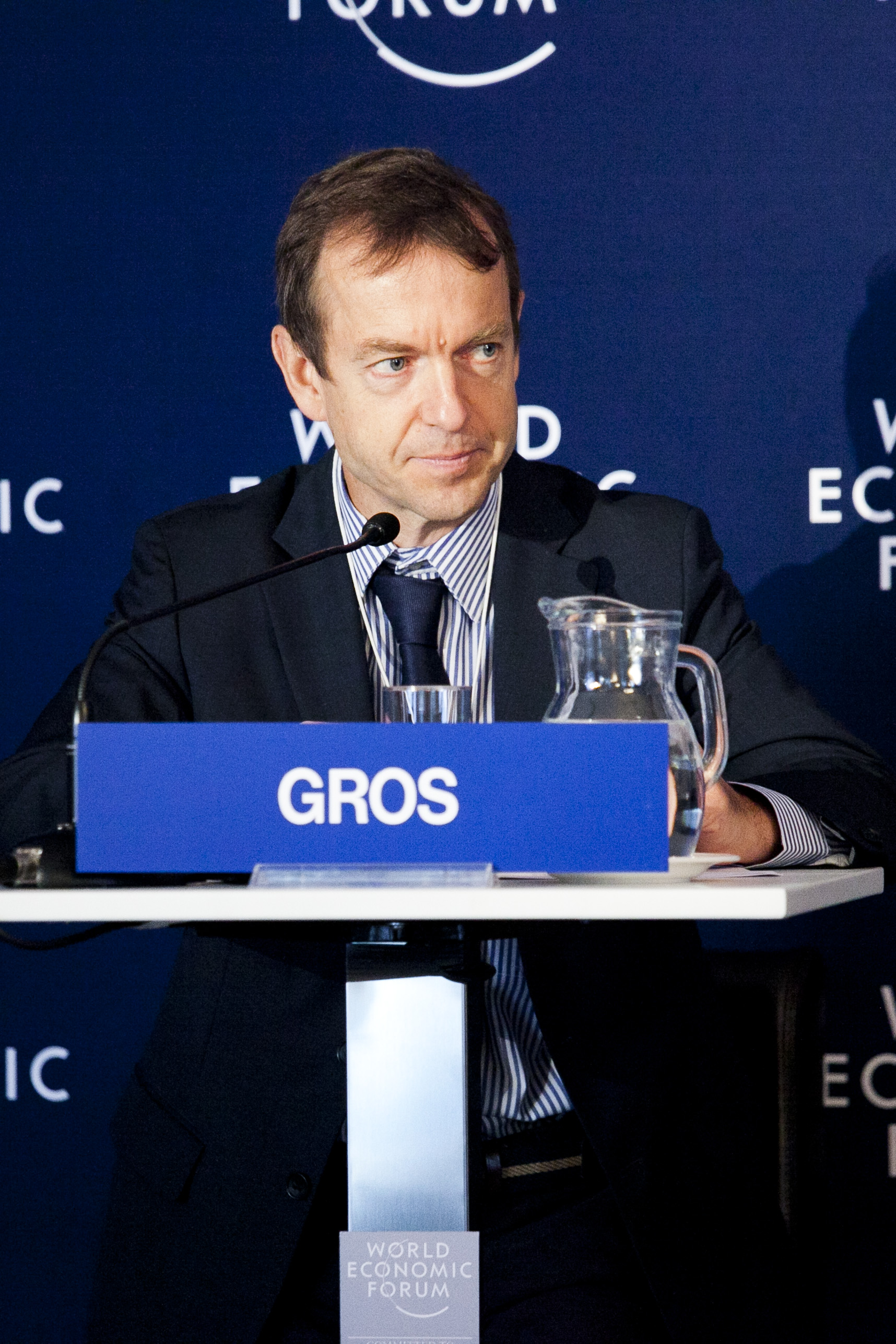
- Gros, as the director of the Centre for European Policy Studies at the World Economic Forum on Europe and Central Asia in Vienna, Austria, June 8, 2011
- Born: 1955 (age 70–71); Germany
- Education: University of Rome; University of Chicago (Ph.D.)
- Occupation: Economist

Daniel Gros (born 1955) is a German economist who currently serves as the director of the Institute for European Policymaking at Bocconi University.

From 2000 to 2020, Gros was the director of the Centre for European Policy Studies, a European think tank. His current research primarily focuses on EU economic policy, specifically on the impact of the euro on capital and labour markets, as well as on the international role of the euro, especially in Central and Eastern Europe. He also monitors the transition towards market economies and the process of enlargement of the European Union towards the east.

== Early life and education ==
Gros was born and raised in Germany. He attended the University of Rome where he received a Laurea in Economia e Commercio. He also received his PhD in economics from the University of Chicago in 1984.

== Career ==
Gros has previously worked for the International Monetary Fund from 1983 to 1986, served as an Economic Advisor to the Directorate General II of the European Commission from 1988 to 1990 co-authoring the study targeted to design the Euro, and served as an advisor to the European Parliament from 1998 to 2005.

He has also taught at the College of Europe (campus of Natolin) and at numerous other universities throughout Europe including the Catholic University of Leuven, the Goethe University Frankfurt, University of Basel, Bocconi University, the Kiel Institute for the World Economy and the Central European University.

He is editor of Economie Internationale and of International Finance. He also writes commentaries for Project Syndicate, an international not-for-profit newspaper syndicate and association of newspapers.

== Other activities ==
- European Systemic Risk Board (ESRB), Member of the Advisory Scientific Committee
- Centre for Economic and Foreign Policy Studies (EDAM), Member of the Advisory Board
- International Finance, Member of the Editorial Board
- Intereconomics – Review of European Economic Policy, Member of the Advisory Board
- World Economic Forum (WEF), Member of the Europe Policy Group (since 2017)
- Center for Social and Economic Research, Member on the International Advisory Council (2003–2006)
