= National Research Council Canada National Science Library =

Coordinates: 45.44375°N 75.61950°W

NRC National Science Library
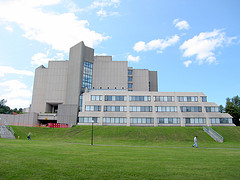
- Location: 1200 Montreal Road, NRC Campus, building M-55, Canada
- Type: National Science Library
- Established: 1917 as library of the National Research Council of Canada; 1967 as National Science Library
- Architect: Shore and Moffatt and Partners

Collection
- Items collected: books, journals, technical reports, databases, in the areas of science, technology, engineering and medicine.
- Size: 50,000 serial titles, 800,000 books, over 2 million technical reports (microfiche).

Access and use
- Circulation: (Library) (Archival)

Other information
- Director: Renée Venne
- Website: NRC National Science Library (NRC NSL)

The National Science Library (NSL), formerly known as the Canada Institute for Scientific and Technical Information or CISTI, began in 1917 as the library of the National Research Council of Canada (NRC). NRC is the Government of Canada's premier research and technology organization (RTO), working with clients and partners to provide innovation support, strategic research, scientific and technical services. The library took on the role of national science library unofficially in 1957 and became the official National Science Library in 1966.

The National Science Library is located in Ottawa, Ontario, and houses one of the world's most comprehensive collections of publications in science, technology, engineering and medicine. It is part of NRC's Knowledge, Information and Technology Services Branch and provides NRC and Canada's research community with information and information services to accelerate discovery, innovation and commercialization.

The NRC Research Press joined the library in 1992. On September 1, 2010, NRC Research Press became a private company called Canadian Science Publishing and is no longer directly affiliated with CISTI or the NRC.

== Partnership initiatives ==
Shared library services – The NSL works with other Government of Canada science-based departments on a number of collaborative initiatives to realize common goals and improve library and knowledge service delivery. The Library currently provides services to four federal departments/agencies, including licensing and acquisitions, cataloguing, reference, library website and document delivery. It also provides all technical library support services to Health Canada as part of a partnership that began in 2010.

Federal Science Library (FSL) – A partnership of seven Government of Canada science departments/agencies implementing a common platform and processes to deliver information discovery and access services to clients. A three-year FSL implementation project was launched in October 2014, with the NSL serving as the project's technical lead.

WorldWideScience Alliance – the Library has been a member of this global science search engine since June 2008.

DataCite – NRC's National Science Library is a founding member of this worldwide consortium for allocating DOIs to datasets.

== Scientific article discovery and digital infrastructure ==
In December 2013, the NSL implemented a digital repository that holds a number of collections, including the NRC Archives photograph collection of over 12,000 photos dating back to 1916.

In June 2011 the library launched the CISTI Mobile website which provides location and search services to popular mobile devices including Android, Blackberry and iPhone platforms. The mobile website provides federated searching across several science and technology information sources at and beyond the National Science Library. The site was likely the first Canadian federal library mobile website.

In April 2010 the library implemented a federated search system allowing the public to search its local and licensed resources together - including a combined search of NPArC, and the NSL catalogue and the NRC Research Press. NRC researchers are also able to combine searches with these and other publisher sites and databases that the NSL licenses on their behalf.

In June 2009 the library launched the NRC Publications Archive (NPArC), an institutional repository providing a single place to search and discover the scientific publications of the National Research Council. It contains tens of thousands of freely available scientific articles, technical reports, book chapters and other NRC-authored publications.

== Research data discovery and stewardship ==
The National Science Library is a leader and participant in a number of initiatives to support data stewardship and discovery in Canada, including being a founding member of both DataCite and Research Data Canada.

In May 2012, the library launched DataCite Canada, a data registration service that allows Canadian data centres to register research data sets and assign Digital Object Identifiers (DOIs).

== Document delivery ==
From the late 1990s until 2010, the library was one of the largest providers of documents in the areas of science technology and medicine in the world.

== Organizational membership ==
NRC NSL is a member of

- the Canadian Association of Research Libraries (CARL)
- the Canadian Library Association (CLA)
- International DataCite Federation
- International Council for Scientific and Technical Information (ICSTI)
- Research Data Canada
