= EconBiz =

German academic search portal

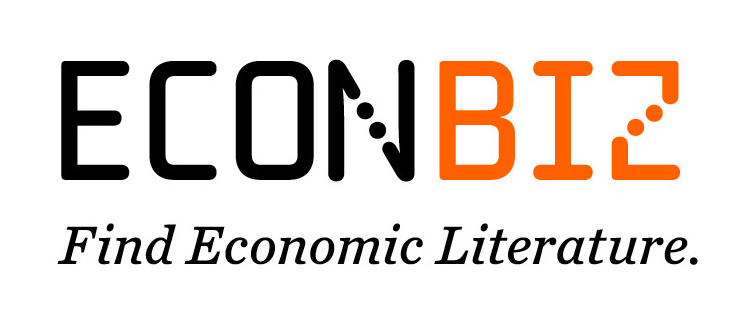
- Producer: ZBW - German National Library of Economics, - Leibniz Information Centre for Economics (Germany)
- Languages: English, German, Spanish and French

Access
- Cost: Free access

Coverage
- Disciplines: Economics, Business Studies
- Record depth: Index, abstracts, full-text
- Geospatial coverage: World
- No. of records: About 10 Mio. records from 8 databases (ECONIS, USB Cologne, RePEc, Online Contents Economic Sciences, EconStor, USB Cologne (Business Full Texts), BASE, ArchiDok)

Links
- Website: www.econbiz.de

EconBiz is an academic search portal for journals, working papers, and conferences in business studies and economics. It is provided by the ZBW - German National Library of Economics, Leibniz Information Centre for Economics. The portal was started in 2002 as the Virtual Library for Economics and Business Studies.

== Background ==
EconBiz was jointly developed by the ZBW – Leibniz Information Centre for Economics and the University and City Library of Cologne (USB Cologne) as a DFG-funded project. The portal first went online in September 2002. Since 2013 EconBiz ist a service of the ZBW.

For the relaunch in October 2010, the metasearch was replaced by a search engine index (Lucene/SOLR). In addition, the STW Thesaurus for Economics was integrated in order to enable automatic searches for synonyms and translations. By integrating other web services, such as the German Electronic Journals Library or the German Journals Database, it is possible to check if and where an item is available (mostly for German libraries). Other services (e.g. check availability in Google Scholar) are integrated for worldwide availability options.

Since 2013, the EconBiz search is based on the open source system VuFind.

In 2017, EconBiz had an optical and technical relaunch and was optimized for mobile devices.

== Services ==
EconBiz offers a number of services:

- The search engine index gives access to international bibliographic references and full texts in economics. Each query searches the content of several German and international databases including articles, books, working papers and journals in both printed and electronic format.
- Many online sources offer access to freely available full texts. Integrated web services also allow users to check the availability of printed or (licensed) electronic items in their local library. A large proportion of publications can be ordered from the document delivery service subito or through WorldShare.
- The index also integrates an overview of current national and international events in economics such as conferences, meetings and summer schools.
- Users can also request a librarian's assistance during their search, by e-mail, chat or telephone, from the integrated online reference service Research Guide EconDesk.
- Online tutorials and videos in the section "Research Skills" are available to users who wish to improve their information literacy. It is intended to support students in all aspects of research for academic work.
- Nobel Prize laureates in Economics are listed with their publications in EconBiz Beta.

EconBiz is available in English, German, French and Spanish.

== Co-operation ==
The EconBiz Partner Network consists of more than 30 institutions in economics and business studies around the world.

== See also ==
- List of academic databases and search engines
- Leibniz Association

== Sources ==
- Pianos, Tamara; Klemenz, Arne Martin (2017): EconBiz-Experiences: Creating our own discovery system for business & economics. IFLA WLIC 2017 Wroclaw, Satellite Meeting - Reference and Information Services & Information Technology Sections: Innovation and the User Experience: Evaluating and Implementing Discovery Systems. Full text: http://library.ifla.org/1839/1/S10-2017-pianos-en.pdf
- Pianos, Tamara (2010): EconBiz — Meeting User Needs with New Technology In: LIBER Quarterly 20(2010)1, S. 4 - 24. Full text: https://www.liberquarterly.eu/articles/10.18352/lq.7972/
