= German National Library of Medicine =

National library

- Deutsche Zentralbibliothek für Medizin (ZB MED)
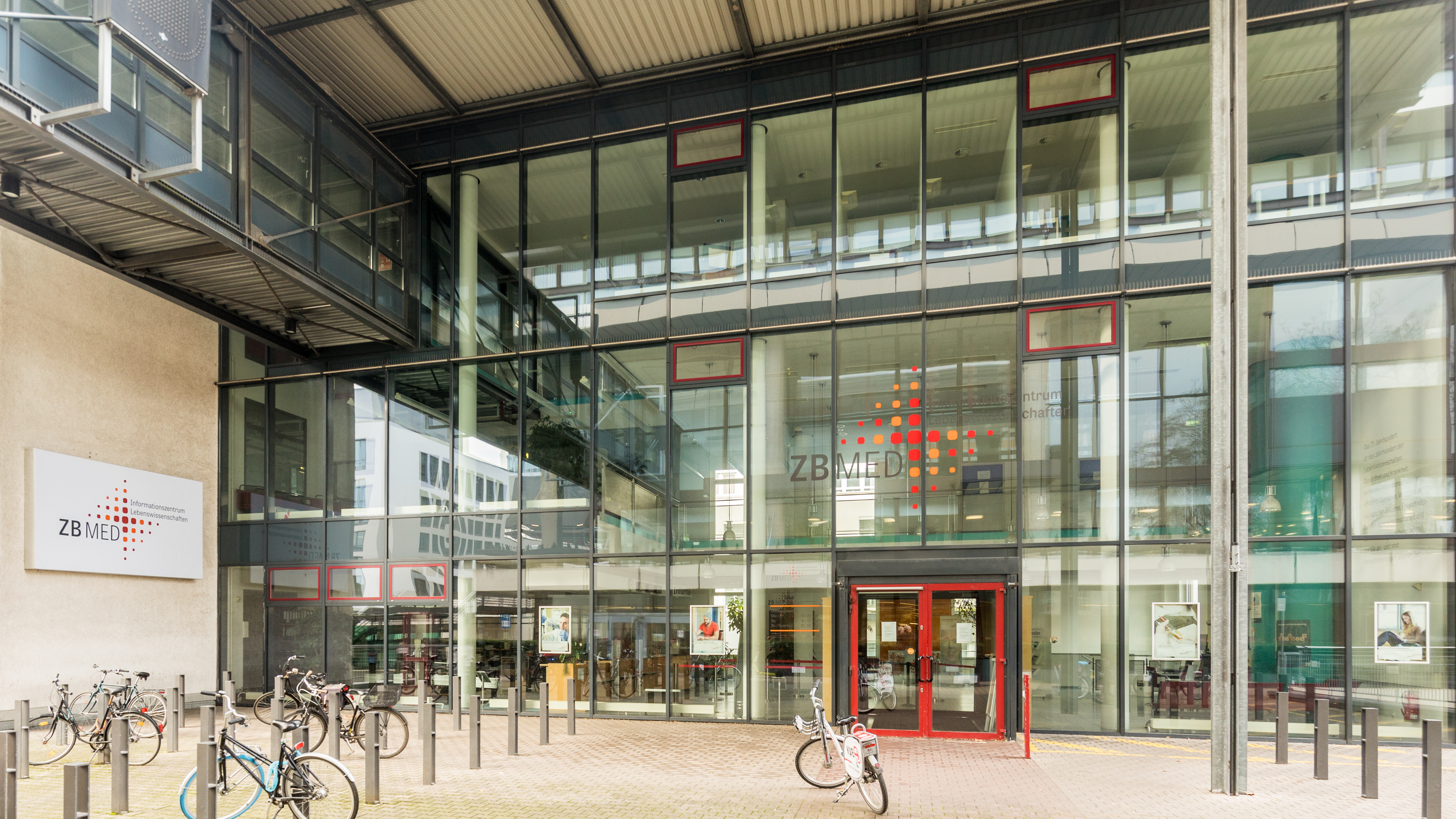
- The German National Library of Medicine, Cologne
- Location: Cologne and Bonn, Germany
- Type: National library, Medical library, Research library, Research centre
- Scope: medicine, health, nutrition, environment, agriculture, bioinformatics
- Established: 1973

Collection
- Items collected: books, journals, electronic media
- Size: 2.1 million volumes (2021)
- Legal deposit: Yes, for publications in the Federal Republic of Germany

Other information
- Budget: €120.75 million + €1,64 million third-party funding and other income (2021)
- Director: Dietrich Rebholz-Schuhmann
- Employees: 176 (2021)
- Website: www.zbmed.de
German National Library of Medicine
German National Library of Medicine Bonn
General information
- Location: Friedrich-Hirzebruch-Allee 4, 53115 Bonn
- Coordinates: 50°43′37″N 7°05′12″E
Other information
- Public transit: Bus 604, 605, 606, 607 Kaufmannstraße; Bus 601, 602, 603; Am Botanischen Garten
German National Library of Medicine Cologne
General information
- Location: Gleueler Straße 60, 50931 Köln
- Coordinates: 50°55′29″N 6°54′59″E
Other information
- Public transit: Tram 9 Lindenburg/Universitätskliniken; Bus 145 Leiblplatz

German National Library of Medicine (German: Deutsche Zentralbibliothek für Medizin), abbreviated ZB MED – Information Centre for Life Sciences in Cologne, together with the Bonn site, is the central specialist library for medicine, public health, nutrition, environmental and agricultural sciences in Germany. The focus is on collection development, full text supply and projects in the field of information sciences. ZB MED provides science, research, students and other interested parties with specialist literature and information. It is financed by the Federal Government and Federal State of North Rhine-Westphalia.

The medical library was initially formed 1973 through the mergers of several much older institutions. Between 2001 and 2003 it was further expanded to include nutritional, environmental and agricultural sciences. As a result, today ZB MED is the world's largest specialist library in its five subjects and the largest medical library in Europe.

On 1 January 2014, the ZB MED was converted into a foundation and given the name ZB MED – Leibniz Information Centre for Life Sciences.

Through a comprehensive transformation process, ZB MED has developed into an information and research centre for the life sciences. ZB MED is strongly committed to Open Science and is involved in four NFDI projects, e.g. NFDI4Health and NFDI4Microbiota.

== History ==
The roots of the ZB MED can be traced to two predecessor institutions important to the heritage of the Rhineland, one founded in 1847 in Bonn and another in 1908 in Cologne.

=== Bonn ===
In 1847 the Royal Agricultural Academy (German: Königlich Landwirthschaftliche Akademie) was founded in Bonn-Poppelsdorf and it became a full degree-granting university in 1919. In 1934 the Agricultural University was incorporated into the University of Bonn and the library became a department of the main university library. By 1950 it was the largest agricultural library in West Germany. In 1962 the library was renamed the National Library of Agricultural Science (German: Zentralbibliothek der Landbauwissenschaft) and given nationwide responsibility for agriculture by the German Research Foundation DFG. It became the German center for the Agricultural Libraries Network (AGLINET) in 1971 and moved into a new building in 1983. In 1987 the building was subject to an arson attack requiring extensive remodeling, although none of its 300,000 items were lost.

=== Cologne ===
The Academy of Practical Medicine (German: Akademie für praktische Medizin) established a hospital library in 1908 and it became a department of the university and City Library of Cologne (German: Universitäts- und Stadtbibliothek Köln) in 1920. The library survived World War II intact and in 1949 the German Research Foundation (DFG) granted it nationwide responsibility for collecting medical literature in West Germany. It also began collecting English language publications through financial support from the DFG. By 1963 the library held 250,000 books and subscribed to 1,100 journal titles.

In 1964, the German Science Council recommended that an independent National Library of Medicine be formed out of the university and City Library's medical department. Formally established in 1973, it was given a mandate to acquire relevant material in all medical subjects and languages. In 1994 the library's name was changed to the "Deutsche Zentralbibliothek für Medizin" and in 1999 moved to a new building on the campus of the Hospital of the University of Cologne.

=== One institution ===
In 1999 the German Science Council recommended Bonn University's agricultural library be merged with the ZB MED. The subject areas of nutrition and the environment were incorporated in 2001 followed by agriculture in 2003. Since then ZB MED operates as ZB MED Medicine. Health. at the site in Cologne and ZB MED Nutrition. Environment. Agriculture. at the site in Bonn.

== Collection ==
The book collection primarily consists of German and English-language volumes, while journals are acquired in all languages and from all countries. The library is a particular specialist in the acquisition of "gray literature", difficult to obtain and not available via the standard book or journal trade. As of 2021, it holds:

- virtual stock: 71,518,985
- shelf meters: 30 km (19 mi)
- magazines: 30,000 titles
- e-books: 15,000

Users are primarily students, doctors, scientists, although the library is open to general public. There is no charge for using the library buildings or borrowing books. The library also provides access to its collections via its own online portals for searching, full-text reading and ordering hard copies. Access to full text journal articles is also available through the Electronic Journals Library (EZB) Since December 2010 all the catalog data of ZB MED is freely licensed under CC0. Remote access is provided via LIVIVO.

== Open access publishing ==
PUBLISSO is the Open Access publishing portal for the life sciences.

It is aimed at all researchers in the life sciences who want to publish their work and research data in an open-access manner – and at all those working in information science. The PUBLISSO team offers advice and workshops on all topics related to "Open Science" and provides support for long-term archiving. Publications include peer-reviewed journals and abstracts from scientific congresses of medical specialty societies. The portal also includes access to the Living Handbooks publishing platform, where contributors can add and update content on a given topic. As of 2024, there are currently five books, Living Handbook of Perishable Food Supply Chains, Living Textbook of Hand Surgery, Methods in cattle physiology and behaviour research, Online Lehrbuch der Medizinischen Psychologie und Medizinischen Soziologie, and Urogenital Infections and Inflammations.

DOI service: ZB MED acts as a DOI issuing office for non-profit online offerings in the fields of medicine, health, nutrition, environmental and agricultural sciences. DOIs (Digital Object Identifiers) ensure the permanent citability of electronic publications and research data. ZB MED issues DOIs as a member of the DataCite consortium and in cooperation with TIB Hannover, which acts as the DOI registration agency and provides the technical infrastructure. DOI allocation is free of charge for academic institutions.

== Search portal ==
LIVIVO: Internet-based search portal for the life sciences (medicine, health, nutrition, environmental and agricultural sciences). Provides access to over 59 million records from over 45 subject data sources and went online in April 2015. Access to licensed databases, e-journals and e-books is possible directly from LIVIVO for users registered at the Cologne site, also as remote access.

COVID-19: In the context of the COVID-19 pandemic, ZB MED has developed several services for scientists. For example, a central Covid-19 Hub was developed. The hub lists various external and internal tools, data sets and literature. A COVID-19-specific version of the search portal LIVIVO was also set up. In addition, ZB MED has significantly simplified access to preprints with the service preVIEW. In the preprint viewer preVIEW, the preprints from arXiv, bioRxiv, ChemRxiv, medRxiv and Preprints.org are combined and enriched with annotations from standardised vocabularies through a process based on text mining.

== Partnerships ==
ZB MED partners with a variety of national and international libraries, institutions and associations.

=== International partnerships ===
It is also the official European supplier for full-text articles through the PubMed bibliographic database operated by the U.S. National Library of Medicine (NLM) – the world's largest medical library. It is also partnered with the Agricultural Information Institute of the Chinese Academy of Agricultural Sciences (AII/CAAS), including a reciprocal agreement on mutual assistance in case of catastrophic events.

=== Other affiliations ===
ZB MED has over 30 additional cooperative arrangements, including:

- Association of the Scientific Medical Societies in Germany (AWMF)
- DataCite e.V.
- Food and Agriculture Organization of the United Nations (FAO)
- German Institute of Medical Documentation and Information (DIMDI)
- Leibniz Association
- Rheinische Friedrich-Wilhelms-Universität Bonn
- TH Köln – Technology, Arts, Sciences
- University of Cologne
- US Department of Agriculture (USDA)
- World Health Organization (WHO)

== See also ==
- German National Library
- German National Library of Economics
- German National Library of Science and Technology
- List of libraries in Germany
