= List of libraries in Hamburg =

List of libraries and archives in Hamburg.

== Libraries and archives ==
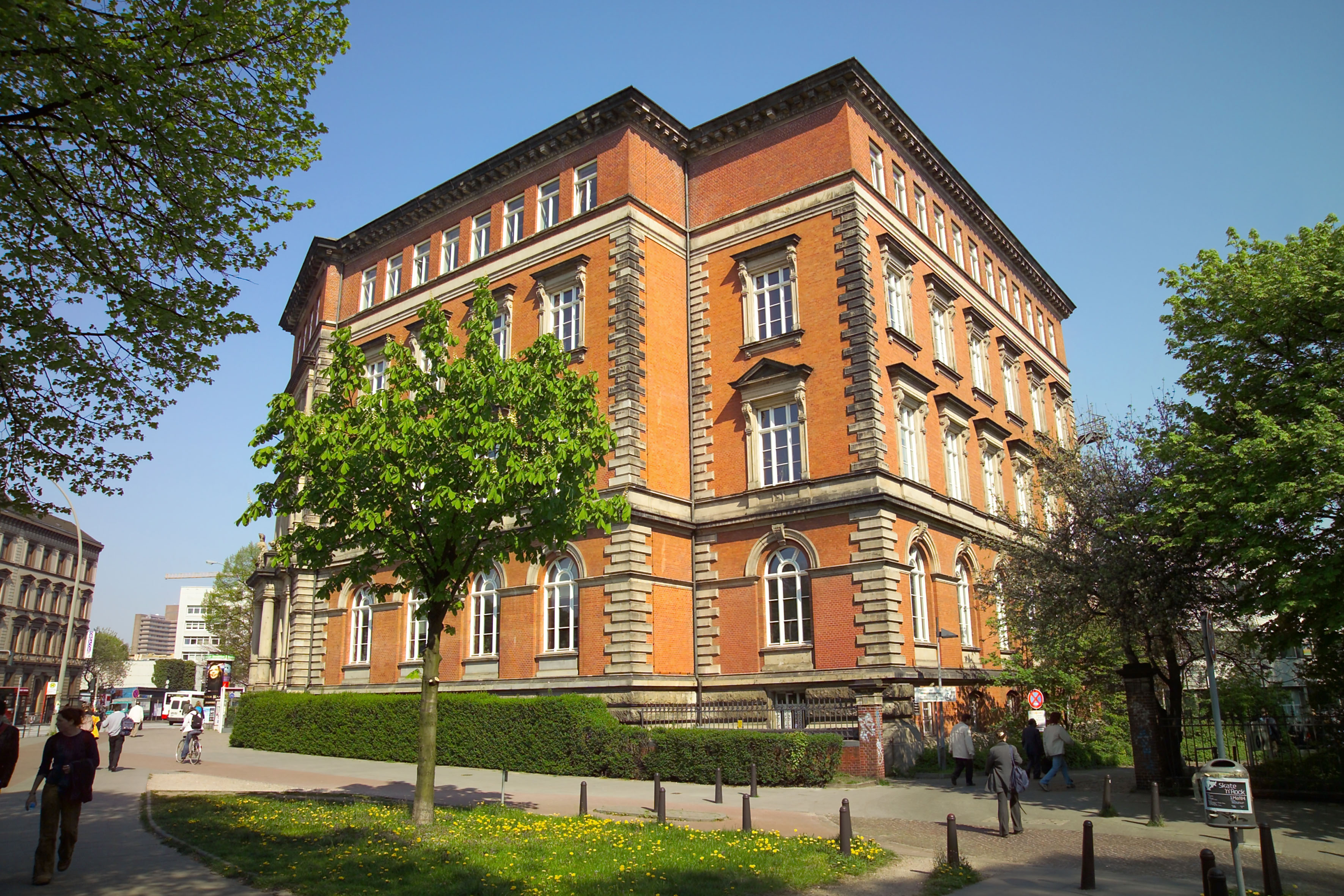
Old part of the state library

In 2006, 39 public libraries existed in Hamburg, organised by the foundation Bücherhallen Hamburg, more than 20 academic libraries, and several special or museums libraries. 7.9 media per inhabitant were borrowed from the public libraries. Therefore, Hamburg, after Bremen (9.0), were ranking at the top of the German states.

There are also four main archives.

Libraries

| German name | Translation | Date (Note: Creation or opening date. If two dates are given the first date is for a preceding organisation or institution.) | Stock of books | Location (Note: Borough or quarter in Hamburg proper (Street if article existing).) | Notes | Website |
|---|---|---|---|---|---|---|
| Bücherhallen | Public libraries | | 1.6 mil. | | Public | (in German) |
| Norddeutsche Blindenhörbücherei und Centralbibliothek für Blinde | Library for the blind | 1905 | 5,000 | | Public | (in German) |
| Staats- und Universitätsbibliothek Hamburg Carl von Ossietzky | State and university library | 1751 | 3 mil. | | Academic | (in German) |

Archives

| German name | Translation | Date | Location | Notes | Website |
|---|---|---|---|---|---|
| Staatsarchiv Hamburg | State archive | 1710 | | | (in German) |
| Hanseatisches Wirtschaftsarchiv | Hanseatic archiv for economy | 2008 | | | (in German) |
| Archiv des Erzbistums Hamburg | Archiv of the Roman Catholic Church in Hamburg | | | | (in German) |
| Archiv des Hamburger Instituts für Sozialforschung | Archive of the institution of social studies | | | | (in German) |

== See also ==
- List of libraries in Germany
