= Klaus Tochtermann =

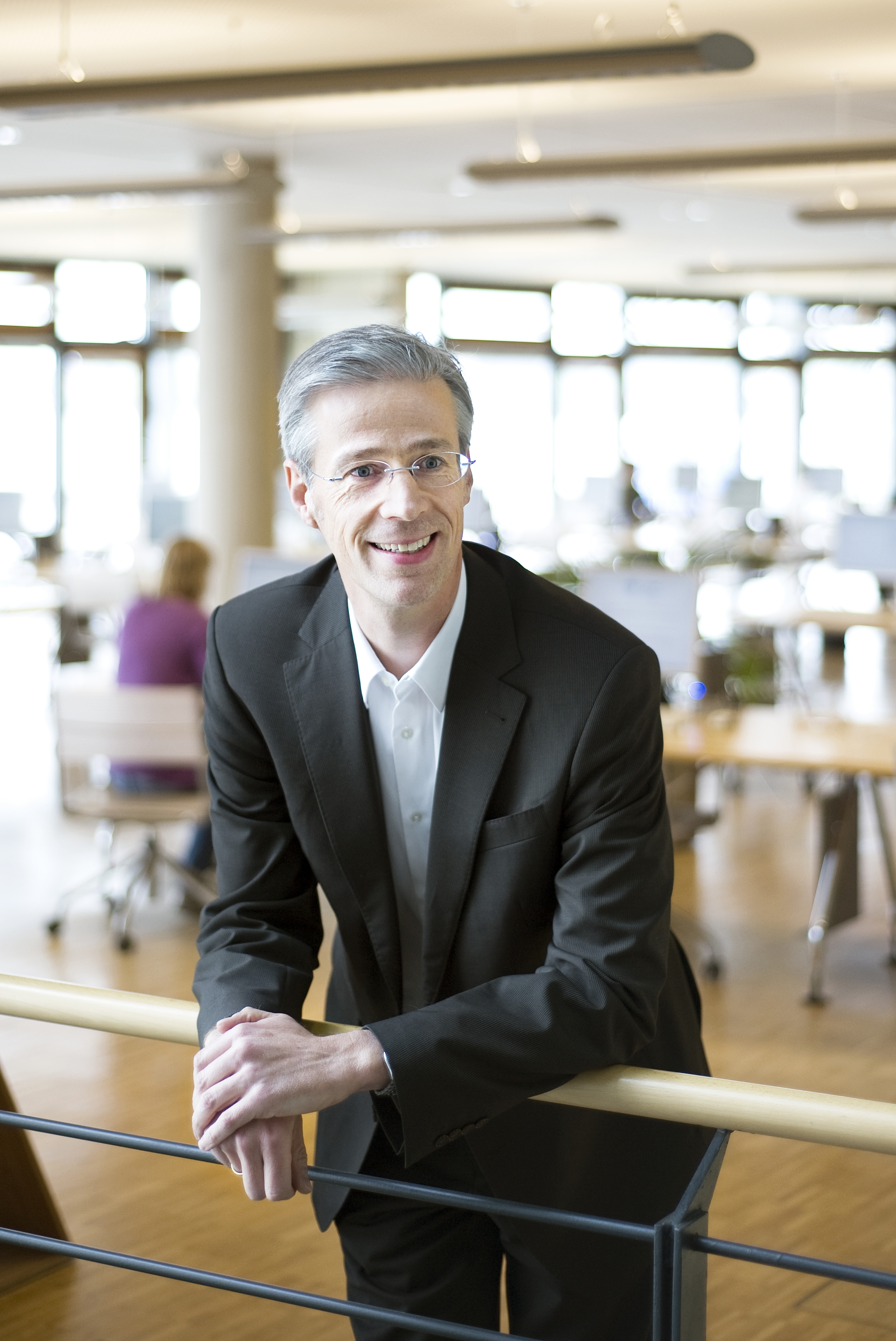
Photo of Klaus Tochtermann

Klaus Tochtermann (born 22 August 1964, Heidelberg) is a professor in the Institute for Computer Science at Kiel University and also the director of the ZBW – German National Library of Economics – Leibniz Information Centre for Economics.

== Education and career ==
Klaus Tochtermann is the son of Werner Tochtermann. He graduated from the Kieler Gelehrtenschule in 1983. From 1985 to 1991, he studied computer science at the Kiel University and Dortmund University. At Dortmund University, he received his doctorate in computer science with a thesis entitled, "A model for hypermedia: description and integrated formalisation of essential hypermedia concepts". Klaus Tochtermann spent the following year as a post-doc at Texas A&M University, Center for the Studies of Digital Libraries, USA with a grant from the Max-Kade-Foundation. His key activities in this time were in the field of web-based tools and services for digital libraries. From 1997 until 2000, he was the division head of the FAW Ulm (Research Institute for Application-oriented Knowledge Processing at Ulm University).

From 2001 until 2010, he was the scientific director of a research institute called Know-Center—a competence center for information technology-based knowledge management located in Austria. In 2001, he founded the I-KNOW conference series in cooperation with Hermann Maurer. In 2002, he received his habilitation in the field of Applied information processing with the thesis, "Personalisation in the Context of Digital Libraries and Knowledge Management". From 2004 until 2010, he held the chair for Knowledge Management at the TU Graz (Austria). From 2007 until 2010, he was also head of the Institute for Networked Media at Joanneum Research—an application-oriented research institution located in Graz.

Since 2010, Klaus Tochtermann has been the director of the ZBW – Leibniz Information Centre for Economics and has held a chair for Digital Information Infrastructures at Kiel University.

In 2012, Klaus Tochtermann initiated the Leibniz Research Alliance Science 2.0. This research alliance addresses the question of how the participatory Internet (e.g. Social Media) changes research and publishing processes, and how information infrastructure institutions can participate in the shaping of these changes.

In 2014, the ZBW – Leibniz Information Centre for Economics headed by Klaus Tochtermann received the national "Library of the Year 2014" award from the German Library Association (dbv).

== Main research focus ==
- Science 2.0, Open Science, European Open Science Cloud
- Knowledge management and knowledge provision
- Semantic technologies

== Selected professional activities ==
- Member of the High Level Expert Group "European Open Science Cloud" of the European Commission (until 2018)
- Member of the Council for Information-Infrastructures
- Member of the board of the Know-Center – Graz (Austria)
- Visiting professor at the Universiti Teknologi MARA (until 2016) (Malaysia)
- Visiting Professor for Digital Infrastructure at St. Gallen University (Switzerland) (2016)
- Member of the Working Group Sustainability for the European Open Science Cloud
- Member of the Research Infrastructure Advisory Council at Hamburg University
- Chair of the Advisory Council for Digitalisation at Graz University of Technology
- Member of the advisory board at numerous institutes of the Leibniz Association

== Selected publications ==
- co-authored with Arben Hajra: Enriching Scientific Publications from LOD Repositories through Word Embeddings Approach. – In: Metadata and Semantics Research : 10th International Conference, MTSR 2016, Göttingen, Germany, November 22–25, 2016. Proceedings / edited by Emmanouel Garoufallou (et al.). – Cham : Springer International Publishing; Imprint : Springer, 2016, S. 278–290. – ISBN 978-3-319-49157-8. – URL: https://www.springer.com/de/book/9783319491561#
- co-authored with Fidan Limani and Atif Latif: Scientific Social Publications for Digital Libraries. - In: Research and Advanced Technology for Digital Libraries : 20th International Conference on Theory and Practice of Digital Libraries, TPDL 2016, Hannover, Germany, September 5–9, 2016 : Proceedings. – Cham : Springer International Publishing; Imprint : Springer, 2016, S. 373–378. – ISBN 978-3-319-43996-9. – (Lecture notes in computer science; 9819). – doi:10.1007/978-3-319-43997-6, Handle: hdl:11108/297
- co-authored with Arben Hajra and Vladimir Radevski: Author Profile Enrichment for Cross-linking Digital Libraries. – In: Research and Advanced Technology for Digital Libraries : Proceedings /19th International Conference on Theory and Practice of Digital Libraries, TPDL 2015, Poznań, Poland, September 14–18, 2015. – Cham : Springer International Publishing, 2015, pp. 124–136. – ISBN 978-3-319-24591-1, 978-3-319-24592-8. – (Series Lecture Notes in Computer Science; 9316). – doi:10.1007/978-3-319-24592-8_10
- co-authored with Atif Latif and Ansgar Scherp: LOD for Library Science : Benefits of Applying Linked Open Data in the Digital Library Setting. – In: Künstliche Intelligenz : KI. – Berlin : Springer, 2015, pp. 1–9. - ISSN 1610–1987. – doi:10.1007/s13218-015-0420-x, Handle: hdl:11108/225
- How Science 2.0 will impact on Scientific Libraries. In: it-information Technology, Volume 56, Number 5 (2014), pp. 224–229, ISSN (Online) 2196–7032, ISSN (Print) 1611–2776; doi:10.1515/itit-2014-1050, September 2014
- co-authored with Atif Latif and Timo Borst: Exposing data from an Open Access Repository for economics as linked data. D-Lib Magazine, September/October 2014, Volume 20, Number 9/10; doi:10.1045/september2014-latif
- co-authored with Atif Latif: Exploring Scientific Publication and Cross-domain Linked Dataset for Similarity – A Case Study. International Journal of Advancements in Computing Technology, ISSN 2005-8039, Vol. 5, No. 11, pp. 179–187, 2013
- co-authored with Atif Latif: Finding Resources in Scholarly Communication and Cross-domain Linked Dataset. – In: Proceedings ICIPM2013: 8th International Conference on Information Processing and Management will be held in Seoul, Republic of Korea from April 1–3, 2013. – Seoul: AICIT, 2013. – ISBN 978-1-4503-1783-2. – Handle: hdl:11108/127
- co-authored with Joachim Neubert: Linked Library Data: Offering a Backbone for the Semantic Web. In: Communications in Computer and Information Sciences; Semantic Technology and Knowledge Engineering Conference (STAKE 2011), Conference Proceedings Springer, Berlin, 2011
- co-authored with Michael Granitzer, Vedran Sabol, Kow Weng Onn, Dickson Lukose: Ontology Alignment – A Survey with Focus on Visually Supported Semi-Automatic Techniques. – In: Future Internet / Molecular Diversity Preservation International (MDPI). – Basel : MDPI, Vol. 2 (2010), Iss. 3, 238–258. – doi:10.3390/fi2030238, Handle: hdl:11108/17
