= German National Library of Science and Technology =

German national library for engineering, technology, and natural sciences

- Technische Informationsbibliothek (TIB)

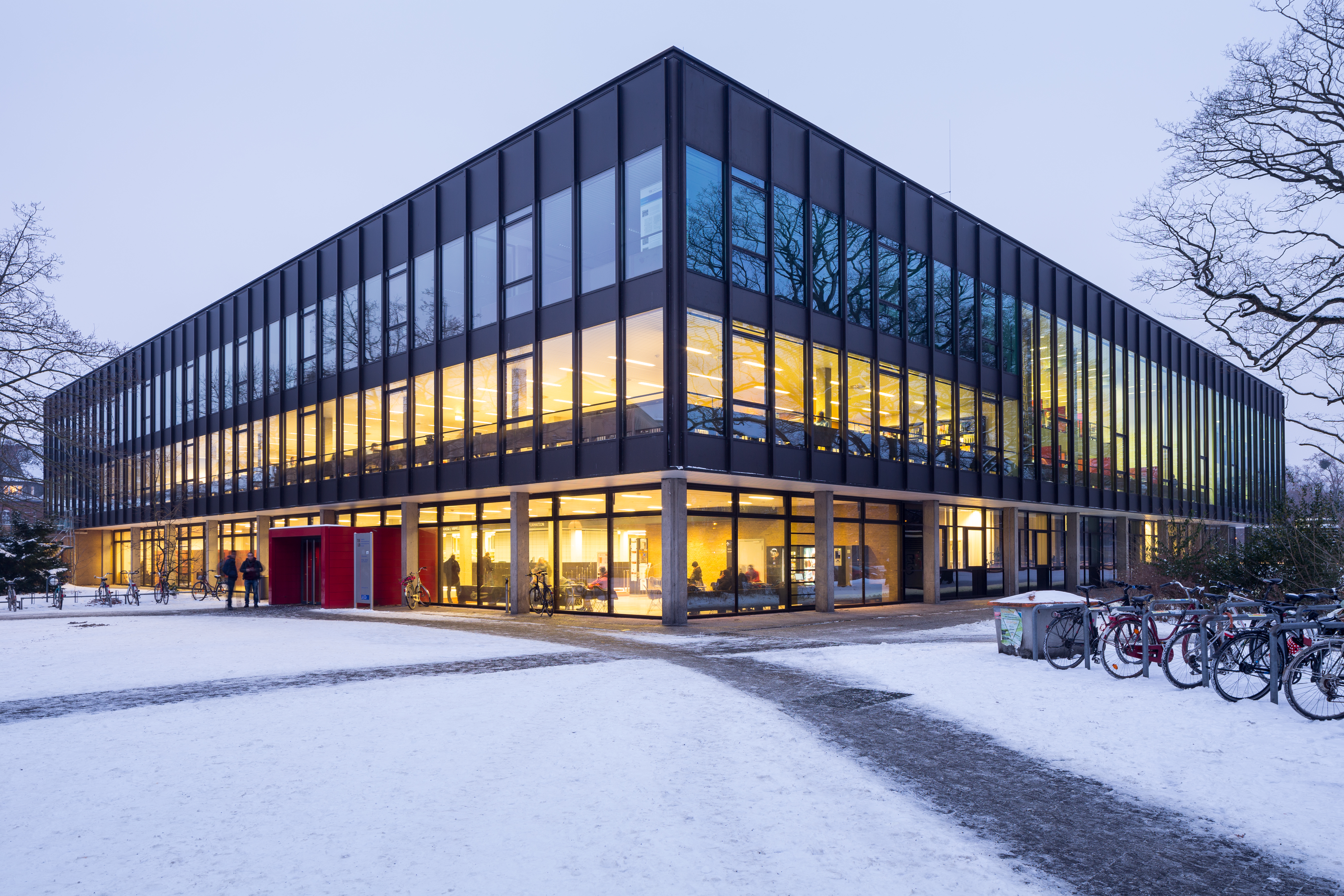
- 52°22′53″N 9°43′11″E
- Location: Welfengarten 1 B 30167 Hanover, Germany
- Type: National library; Research library
- Scope: Engineering, architecture, chemistry, computer science, mathematics, physics
- Established: 1959; 67 years ago

Collection
- Items collected: Books, journals, electronic media
- Size: 8.9 million media units 17.3 million patents
- Legal deposit: Yes

Access and use
- Population served: Researchers, business clients, students, general public

Other information
- Director: Sören Auer
- Employees: 500 (2022)
- Website: www.tib.eu/en/

The German National Library of Science and Technology (German: Technische Informationsbibliothek), abbreviated TIB, is the national library of the Federal Republic of Germany for all fields of engineering, technology, and the natural sciences. It is jointly funded by the Federal Ministry of Education and Research (BMBF) and the 16 German states. Founded in 1959, the library operates in conjunction with the Leibniz Universität Hannover. In addition to acquiring scientific literature, it conducts applied research in such areas as the archiving of non-textual materials, data visualization and the future Internet. The library is also involved in a number of open access initiatives. With a collection of about 8.9 million items in 2012, the TIB is the largest technology and natural science library in the world.

== Collection ==
The TIB acquires literature in all engineering fields as well as architecture, information technology, chemistry, mathematics, physics and other basic sciences. It is a particular specialist in the acquisition of "gray literature"; that is, literature difficult to obtain and not available via the standard book or journal trade. It also holds a large number of standards, norms, patents, source data, scientific conference proceedings, government research papers and dissertations. Special collections include the "Albrecht Haupt Collection" of digitally rendered architectural drawings, and a regional focus on technical literature from East Asia and Eastern Europe. The film and audiovisual material held previously by IWF Knowledge and Media (IWF Wissen und Medien) is now held by TIB.

The TIB's holdings total 10 million media units (as of December 31, 2022):

- 6.1 million books
- 3.4 million non-electronic materials such as micro-materials
- 143.3 million metadata in the index
- about 54,650 licensed and digitized electronic journals
- about 6,950 continuously held journals (non-electronic)
- about 6,560 subject databases

In 2010, the physical collection occupied 125 kilometres (78 mi) of shelving.

== Services ==
=== Open Research Knowledge Graph ===
To counteract the flood of publications in the sciences, TIB is developing the Open Research Knowledge Graph, with which the scientific contributions from scientific publications can be organized in a flexible database (the Knowledge Graph). In 2024, the TIB published the ORKG ASK service, which enables AI-supported scientific questions to be answered on the basis of a corpus of 80 million scientific publications.

=== DOI Registration Agency ===
In 2005 the TIB became the world's first Digital Object Identifier (DOI) registration agency for research data sets in the fields of technology, natural sciences and medicine. It offers registration for the results of any publicly funded research conducted in Europe.

=== Depository library ===
The TIB is a legal deposit library for research projects sponsored by various agencies of the German Federal Government, in particular:

- Federal Ministry of Education and Research (BMBF)
- Federal Ministry of Economics and Technology (BMWi) in the areas of energy, aviation, and aerospace research
- Federal Ministry for the Environment, Nature Conservation and Nuclear Safety (BMU) in energy research and energy technologies
- Agency for Renewable Resources (FNR) on behalf of the Federal Ministry of Food, Agriculture and Consumer Protection (BMELV)

=== Leibniz Open Access Repository ===
The TIB is a member of the Leibniz Association, a consortium of 87 non-university research institutes in Germany. In support of the Association's open access goals, the TIB operates the Leibniz Open Access Repository in cooperation with Leibniz Institute for Information Infrastructure (formerly Fachinformationszentrum Karlsruhe). The TIB advises the Leibniz Association's various member organizations, scientists and staff on depositing publications in the repository according to open access guidelines.

=== Competence Center for Non-Textual Material ===
The amount, usage and importance of non-textual materials such as 3D models, AV media and research data is continually increasing and only a small proportion can be searched at the present time. The goal of the TIB Competence Centre for Non-Textual Materials (Kompetenzzentrum für nicht-textuelle Materialien, abbreviated to KNM) is to fundamentally improve access to, and the use of, such non-textual materials. The TIB also develops new multimedia analysis methods such as morphology, speech or structure recognition to create indexing and metadata to help researchers and educators make better use of these complex materials. In addition, the competence center is dedicated to the preservation of multimedia objects, the assignment of DOI, and knowledge transfer.

=== GetInfo online service ===
TIB operates the GetInfo portal for science and technology with interdisciplinary search capabilities for the other German National Libraries as well as access to more than 150 million data sets from other specialized databases, publishers and library catalogs. The TIB also makes scientific videos of lectures, conferences, computer animations, simulations and experiments available via GetInfo. These video items can be searched free-of-charge and can be downloaded via Flash Player.

== Partnerships ==
The TIB partners with a variety of national and international libraries, institutions and associations.

=== Goportis library network ===
The TIB is one of three partners in the Leibniz Library Network for Research Information consortium Goportis, the others being the German National Library of Economics (ZBW) and German National Library of Medicine (ZB MED). This initiative develops and operates online search services, online full-text delivery services, licensing agreements, non-textual materials, document preservation efforts, data storage, and open access.

=== Institutional partners ===
The TIB is also the scientific information provider for researchers in the newly independent states of the former Soviet Union, including Azerbaijan, Georgia, Kazakhstan, Kyrgyzstan, Tajikistan and Ukraine. It also collaborates with numerous organizations in China, Japan and Eastern Europe. Notable institutional partnerships include:

- Chinese Academy of Sciences, Beijing
- DataCite e.V.
- German Physical Society (DPG)
- Library of the Delft University of Technology (TU), Delft, Netherlands
- State Scientific and Technical Library of Ukraine (SSTL), Kyiv, Ukraine
- Online Computer Library Center (OCLC), Ohio, United States
- Russian Academy of Natural Sciences, Moscow, Russia
- Russian National Public Library for Science and Technology (GPNTB), Moscow, Russia
- Swiss Federal Institute of Technology Zurich, Zürich, Switzerland

=== Other partners ===
- International Association of Technological University Libraries

== Research projects ==
As part of the German national research infrastructure, the TIB conducts its own applied research, particularly in the field of information science. In cooperation with a variety of other institutions, these projects focus on the areas of visual searching, data visualization, the Semantic Web, and the Future Internet.

=== PROBADO 3D ===
PROBADO is a project to develop tools for the automatic indexing, storage and delivery of non-textual documents such as 3D models. Its goal is to enable academic libraries to deal with multimedia objects just as easily as with textual information. Tools include searching by intuitive drawing in 2D and 3D and delivery of results while drawing. For this initiative the TIB partnered with the Technical University of Darmstadt, the University of Bonn and the Technical University of Graz.

=== Visual access to research data ===
This project, funded by the Leibniz Association, is a joint effort of the TIB, the GRIS Darmstadt (Interactive Graphics Systems at the Technical University of Darmstadt) and the IGD (Fraunhofer Institute for Computer Graphics). It deals with developing approaches to the interactive, graphical access to research data in order to make it easily represented and searchable. The project is tasked with developing methods for data analysis, visual search systems, metadata-based searching and prototype implementation.

=== SCOAP^{3}-DH ===
SCOAP^{3} (Sponsoring Consortium for Open Access Publishing in Particle Physics) is a global consortium of organizations in high energy physics, physics research centers and leading international libraries. Its goal is to convert essential journals in particle physics that are presently financed by subscriptions into open access journals with the support of the publishers. SCOAP^{3}-DH is funded by the German Research Foundation, working in cooperation with the German Electron Synchrotron (DESY) and the Max Planck Society (MPS).

=== Other research projects ===
Additional TIB research projects include:

- arXiv-DH: development the Open Access platform arXiv for German universities and other institutions
- DP4lib: development of a reusable and flexible infrastructure for digital preservation
- Knowledge Exchange: a national initiative in Germany to extend the use of information and communications technology in research and teaching
- KomFor: a Center of Expertise for Earth and Environment research data
- Linked Heritage: metadata, standards, persistent identification and linked data systems for digital cultural heritage in Europe
- STI Adaptations to Mobile Web Devices: approaches for enhancing access to STI through mobile devices
- TIB-Transfer: development and implementation of a concept for the commercialization of research results
- ViFaChem II: development of concepts and tools for the Virtual Library of Chemistry II

== See also ==
- German National Library
- German National Library of Economics
- German National Library of Medicine
- List of libraries in Germany
