= Intereconomics =

- Editor: Nicole Waidlein
- Categories: Economics
- Frequency: Bimonthly
- Publisher: sciendo
- First issue: 1966; 59 years ago
- Country: Germany
- Website: www.intereconomics.eu
- ISSN: 0020-5346 (print); 1613-964X (web)
- OCLC: 01753365

Intereconomics – Review of European Economic Policy is a bimonthly journal covering economic and social policy issues in Europe or affecting Europe. The editor-in-chief is Dr. Nicole Waidlein. It is an official publication of the German National Library of Economics (ZBW) and the Centre for European Policy Studies.

== History and profile ==
Intereconomics was established in 1966 at the Hamburg Institute of International Economics. In 2007, this institute was merged with the ZBW. In January 2009, the ZBW joined forces with the Centre for European Policy Studies, with the aim of making the magazine the leading forum for research-based discussions of major European economic policy issues.

The journal consists of the editorial, forum, and articles sections. The editorial section contains brief comments on current questions of economic policy. In the forum section, several authors voice their opinions on one particular current economic policy problem. The articles deal with economic policy issues and trends.

== Advisory board ==
- Eileen Appelbaum
- Ulrich Blum
- Ralf Boscheck
- László Csaba
- Robert Czudaj
- Sylvester C. W. Eijffinger
- Daniel Gros
- Carsten Hefeker
- Arne Heise
- Wim Kösters
- Phedon A. Nicolaides
- Jacques Pelkmans
- Ronald Schettkat
- Gunther Tichy

== See also ==
- Wirtschaftsdienst
