= Phantastische Bibliothek Wetzlar =

Coordinates: 50.5529°N 8.5049°E

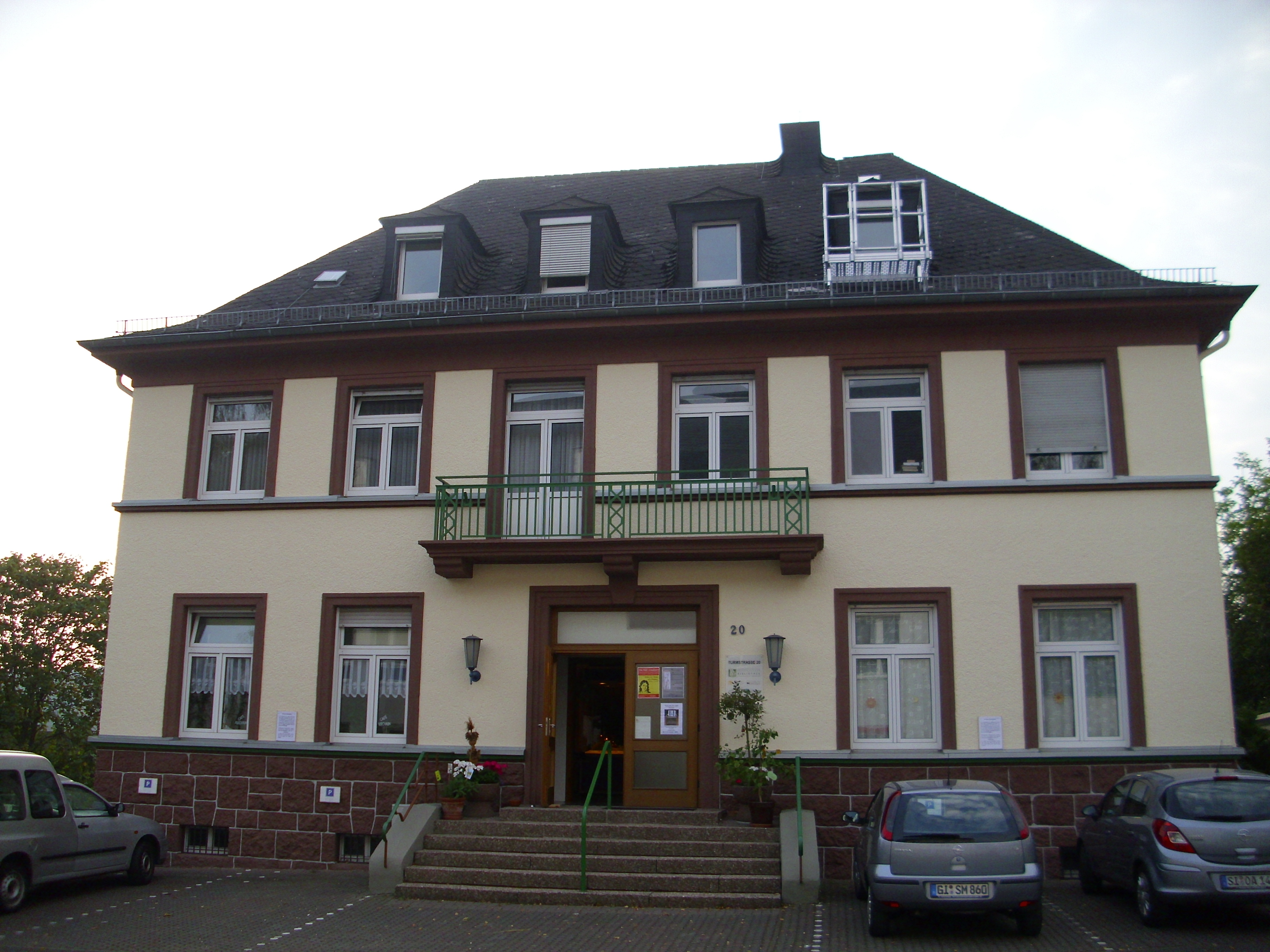
Phantastische Bibliothek

The Phantastische Bibliothek Wetzlar (Fantastic Library of Wetzlar) was founded in 1989 and has become one of the largest public libraries specialised in Fantasy literature worldwide, it is the largest in Europe. It is generally a reference library, open for the public and researchers.

The aim of the library is to collect everything in print which belongs to: science fiction, fantasy, literature, classical fantasy, horror, utopian novels, fantastic journey and adventure novels, fairy tales, saga, myths, etc.

At the moment the library is in possession of over 300,000 titles. This collection includes hardcovers and paperbacks, dissertations, magazines and fanzines. There are also some rare materials, e.g. the documenta 1984 science-fiction-collection.

== Work ==
The Phantastische Bibliothek Wetzlar closely cooperates with schools, universities and literary societies. Seminars, conferences and exhibitions are held. Once a year the library organizes the "Wetzlarer Tage der Phantastik” (Wetzlar Fantastic Conference), a literary symposium for authors, journalists, publishers and the public.

Zentrum für Literatur (Centre of Literature) is a department of the library and offers programmes in general education, reading and language courses, e.g. to support the children's reading skills.

== Publications ==
The Phantastische Bibliothek Wetzlar is the editor of the scholarly series Schriftenreihe und Materialien der Phantastischen Bibliothek Wetzlar which publishes monographs and collections of essays.
