= Library of Friedrich Nietzsche =

Private library of Friedrich Nietzsche

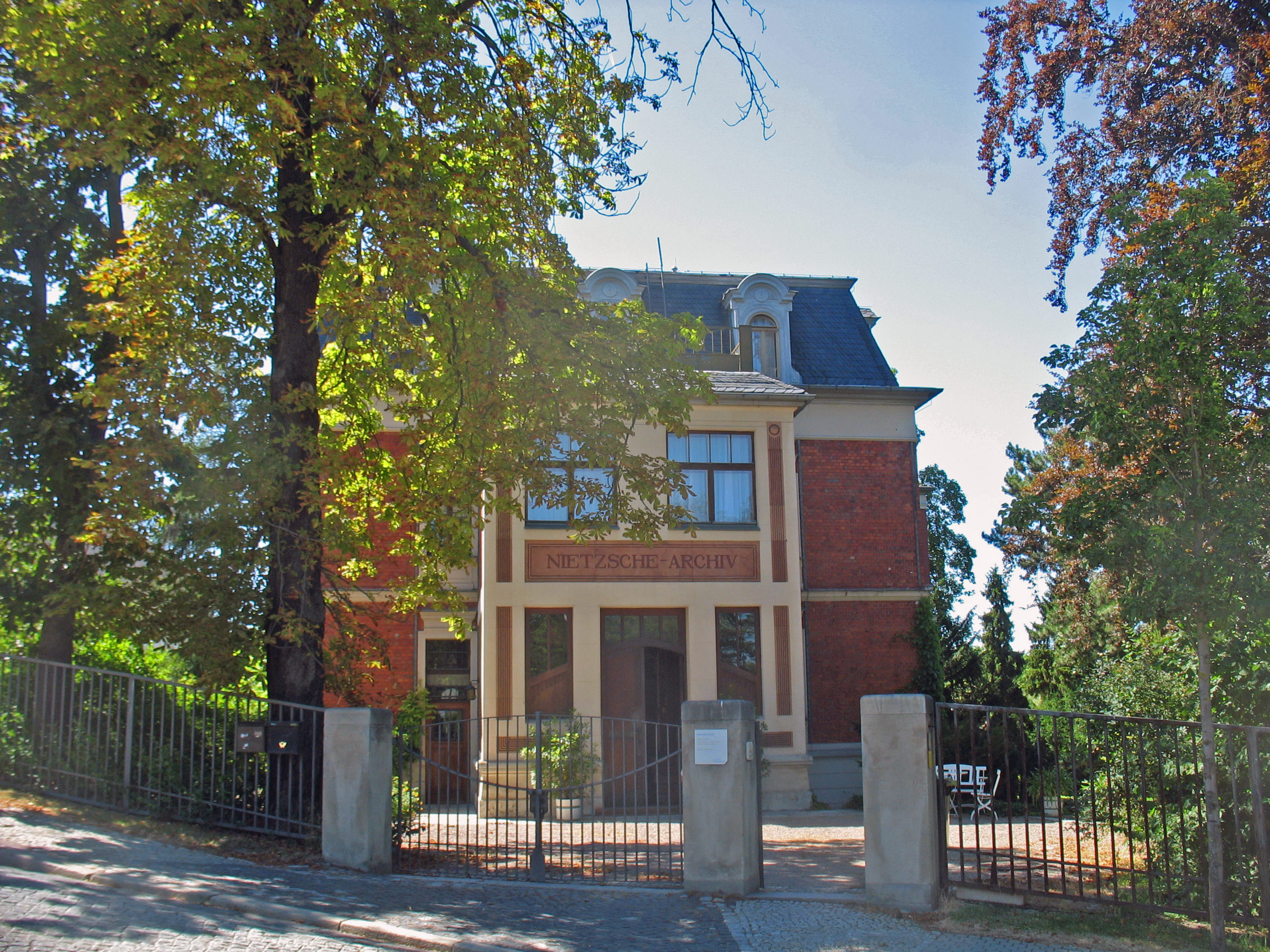
The Nietzsche Archives in Weimar, Germany.

The German philosopher Friedrich Nietzsche owned an extensive private library, which has been preserved after his death. Today this library consists of some 1,100 volumes, of which about 170 contain annotations by him, many of them substantial. However, fewer than half of the books he read are found in his library.

== The Greeks, Hegel and Spinoza ==
Nietzsche, who had been a student and a professor of philology, had a thorough knowledge of the Greek philosophers. Among modern philosophers, his reading included Kant, Mill and Schopenhauer, who became major targets of criticism in his philosophy. He also mentions reading Hegel at the age of twenty. Late in life he read Spinoza, whom he called his "precursor", in particular for his criticisms of free will, teleology and his thoughts on the role of affects, joy and sadness. Nietzsche, however, opposed Spinoza's theory of conatus, for which he substituted the "will to power" (Wille zur Macht); and he replaced Spinoza's formula "Deus sive Natura" (God or Nature) by "Chaos sive Natura".

== Schopenhauer and Mainländer ==
Philipp Mainländer's The Philosophy of Redemption, can still be found in the library. Nietzsche read the work, of which a large part is a criticism of Schopenhauer's metaphysics, while he was parting ways with Schopenhauer. Nietzsche maintained an interest in the philosopher: among his books was Mainländer, a new Messiah, written by Max Seiling, published a decade later.

== French theorists and novelists ==
Nietzsche admired Montaigne, as well as the French moralists of the 17th century such as La Rochefoucauld, La Bruyère and Vauvenargues, whose books he received from his sister in 1869. He also admired Pascal, Voltaire, and, most of all, Stendhal. He also read Eduard von Hartmann's "Philosophy of the Unconscious", and alludes to it in some of his works. Nietzsche read in 1883 Paul Bourget's Essais de psychologie contemporaine, from which he borrowed the French term décadence. Bourget had an organicist conception of society. Nietzsche had already encountered organicist theories in Rudolf Virchow's Die Cellularpathologie (1858) and in Alfred Espinas's Des sociétés animales (1887; Die thierischen Gesellschaften, Braunschweig, 1879). Nietzsche's 1888 notebooks also contain references to Victor Brochard's Les Sceptiques grecs (1887); to Charles Féré, who had concerns about "degeneration" issues; and to Louis Jacolliot's Les Lois de Manou, which became for Nietzsche the "classical [case] of pia fraus, the pious lie of religion" In his notebooks, Nietzsche copied several passages of Féré, later included, without quotation marks, in The Will to Power published by Elisabeth Förster-Nietzsche and Peter Gast. Finally, Wolfgang Müller-Lauter showed that Nietzsche also read the embryologist Wilhelm Roux. In a letter of 26 February 1888 to Peter Gast, Nietzsche mentions his reading of the posthumous works of Charles Baudelaire (published in 1887).

== Darwinism ==
Nietzsche also became familiar with Darwinism through his early reading of Friedrich Albert Lange's Geschichte des Materialismus (1865), which criticized Darwin's gradualism. Lange alluded to Stirner in this book, whom he (incorrectly) identified with Schopenhauerian positions. He also mentioned Blanqui's L'Eternité par les astres, which discussed the thesis of an eternal return. Besides Lange, he read the anti-Darwinist botanist Carl Nägeli's Mechanisch-physiologische Theorie der Abstammungslehre (1884) in the period of Beyond Good and Evil, which became his main source concerning physiology. Nietzsche targeted Social Darwinism, in particular Herbert Spencer, John Stuart Mill and David Strauss (he read all of them, and titled the first Untimely Meditation "David Strauss: the Confessor and the Writer").

== Tolstoy and Biblical focused works ==
He also read Tolstoy's My Religion (Paris, 1885), the Jewish historian Julius Wellhausen on Arab antiquities and his Prolegomena zur Geschichte Israels (Berlin, 1882), the first volume of the Journal of the Goncourt brothers, thoughts of Benjamin Constant on German theater, Ernest Renan's Life of Jesus — whom he opposed —, and Dostoevsky's The Possessed (Paris, 1886 – read in 1887). Julius Wellhausen became famous for his critical investigations into Old Testament history and into the composition of the Hexateuch, the uncompromising scientific attitude he adopted in testing its problems bringing him into antagonism with the older school of biblical interpreters. He became arguably best known for the Documentary hypothesis on the origin of the Pentateuch. Wellhausen influenced Nietzsche in his writing of The Antichrist and in his musings on the internal discrepancies of the Bible.

== Emerson ==
Nietzsche was also an admirer and frequent reader of Ralph Waldo Emerson.

== See also ==
- Nietzsche-Archiv
