= EconStor =

Disciplinary repository

Econstor
- Producer: ZBW – Leibniz Information Centre for Economics (Germany)
- Languages: German, English

Access
- Cost: Free

Coverage
- Disciplines: Economics, Business Studies
- Format coverage: working papers, articles, books
- No. of records: 212,000

Links
- Website: www.econstor.eu

EconStor is a disciplinary repository for Economics and Business Studies which offers research literature in Open Access and makes it findable in various portals and search engines. The service is operated by the ZBW – Leibniz Information Centre for Economics.

The majority of the publications originates from German institutions in economic research and is provided in accordance with usage agreements. Individual researchers can also submit their scholarly papers to EconStor.

EconStor maintains a list of influential journals publishing literature in economics. According to latest criteria toll access journals and open access journals can only be included in EconStor collections/archives on condition that they are indexed in Scopus or SSCI and DOAJ as well. EconStor also feed its data to other databases and portals like EconBiz, Google & Google Scholar, BASE — Bielefeld Academic Search Engine, WorldCat, and OpenAIRE.

Publications include mostly working papers, discussion papers and conference proceedings, but also articles in journals and theses.

The most important professional association for economists in Germany, the Verein für Socialpolitik (German Economic Association), has been using EconStor since 2010 to publish conference papers submitted for its Annual Meeting online.

One of the most important online dissemination channels for EconStor documents is the database RePEc, where EconStor is also one of the largest content providers.

EconStor counts among the largest repositories in its discipline and in Germany with more than 212,000 full-texts.

== See also ==
- Open access in Germany
