= International Shariʽah Research Academy for Islamic Finance =

Malaysian research institute

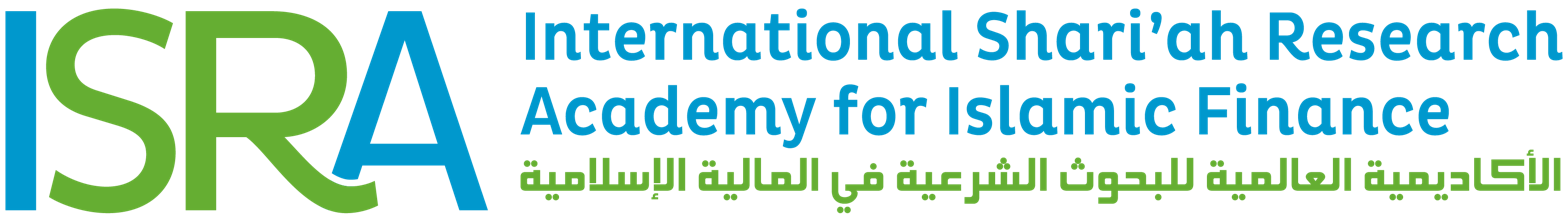
- Type: Private
- Established: 26 March 2008
- Location: Kuala Lumpur
- Website: www.isra.my

International Shariʽah Research Academy for Islamic Finance (ISRA) is an Islamic finance research institution in Malaysia that focuses on sharia-related issues.

ISRA was established on 26 March 2008 by the Central Bank Malaysia (BNM).

== Background ==
ISRA is a repository of knowledge for Shari’ah views (fatwas) and undertakes studies on contemporary issues, especially those relating to Shari’ah, in the Islamic finance industry. ISRA also contributes towards strengthening human capital development in Shari’ah expertise relevant to Islamic finance and provides a platform for greater engagement amongst practitioners, scholars, regulators and academics via research and dialogue, in both the domestic and international arenas.

== Objectives ==
- Spearhead and Conduct Applied Shari’ah Research in Islamic Finance
- Enrich Resources of Knowledge in Islamic Finance
- Provide Avenues for the Development of Shari’ah Practice In Islamic Finance
- Propagate Harmonisation and Mutual Respect in Islamic Finance Practices

== Key Specialisation ==
- Shari'ah and Applied Research
- Publications
- Events
- Talent Development

== Shari'ah and Applied Research ==
- Islamic Banking Unit
- Islamic Capital Market Unit
- Takaful Unit
- Fatwa and Translation Unit

== Publication ==
=== Books ===
- ISRA Research Papers
- ISRA International Journal of Islamic Finance (English)
- ISRA International Journal of Islamic Finance (Arabic)
- Articles

=== Proceedings ===
- ISRA Islamic Finance Space (IIFS)
- ISRA Bulletins
- ISRA-Bloomberg Bulletins

== Events ==
- ISRA International Shariah Scholars' Forum (ISSF)
- ISRA Muzakarah Cendekiawan Syariah Nusantara (MCSN)
- ISRA-IRTI-Durham University Strategic Roundtable Discussion (SRD)
- ISRA International Colloquium for Islamic Finance (IICIF)
- ISRA Thematic Workshops

== Talent Development Programmes ==
- In-House Shari'ah Management Training Programme
- Practical Training and Fellowship Programme
- Shari'ah Scholarship
