= International Council for Scientific and Technical Information =

- Abbreviation: ICSTI
- Formation: 1984; 42 years ago
- Type: INGO
- Location: Paris, France
- Region served: Worldwide
- Official language: English, French
- President: Jan Brase (Germany)
- Website: ICSTI Official website

The International Council for Scientific and Technical Information (ICSTI) is a broad-based, international, not-for-profit membership organization based in Paris, France. It aims to promote cooperation among all those engaged in the scientific communication process by engaging national scientific unions and their respective scientific communities.

The highest authority is the General Assembly consisting of representatives of all members, which convenes once a year. There are normally two meetings in Europe followed by one in North America or another region.

The organization is led by an executive board which has all power to carry on the business of ICSTI between meetings of the General Assembly.
