= Hamburg Institute of International Economics =

Economic research institute

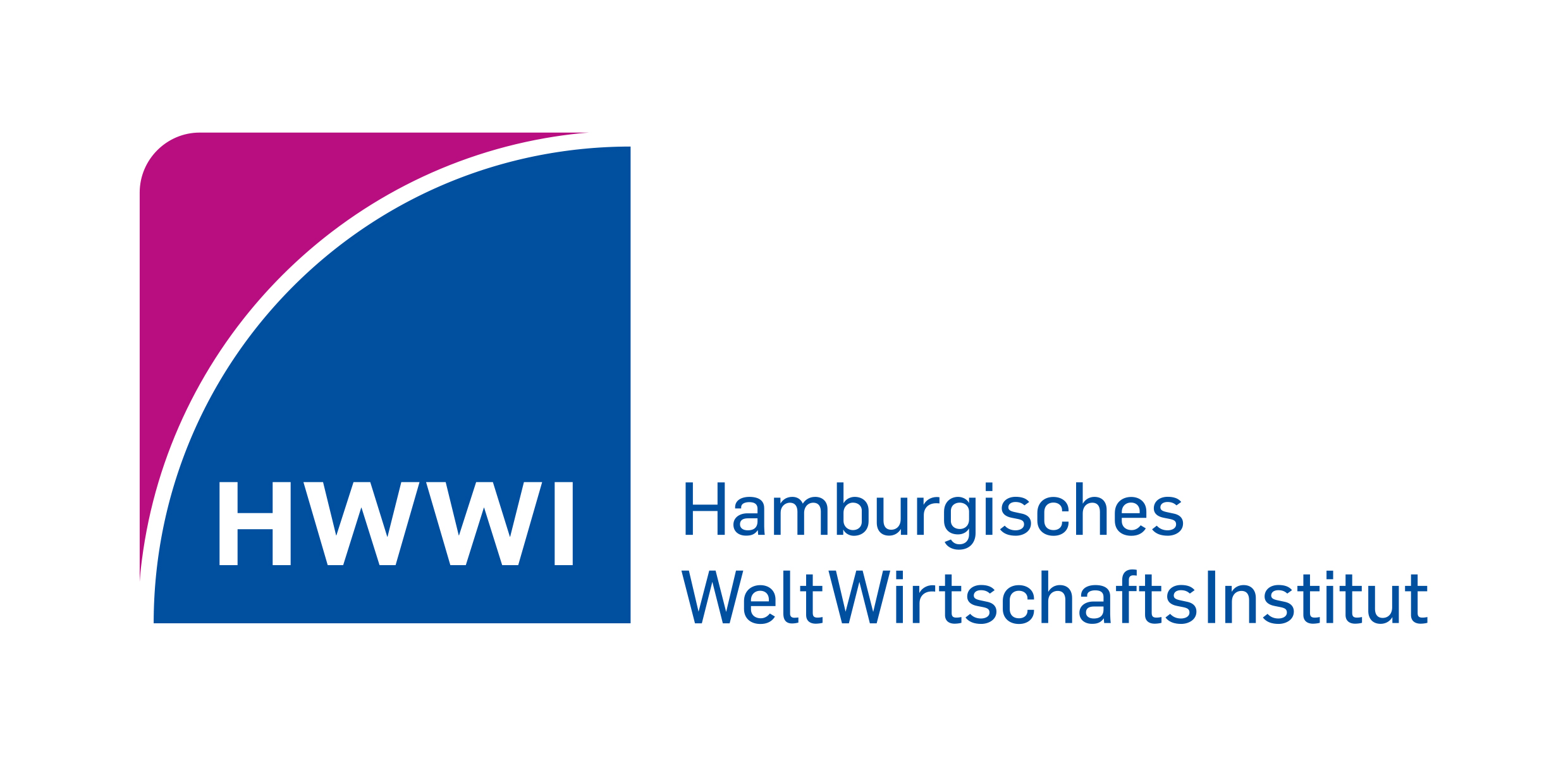

Hamburg Institute of International Economics (HWWI) is either a think tank or a privately funded economic research institute whose sole shareholder since 2016 has been the Hamburg Chamber of Commerce.

== History ==
The HWWI was founded in 2005 to continue parts of the research work of the Hamburg Institute of International Economics (HWWA). The scientific partner is Helmut Schmidt University/University of the Federal Armed Forces Hamburg. Until 2016, the University of Hamburg was also a shareholder of the HWWI. The HWWI publishes the HWWI Commodity Price Index.

Since 2011, the HWWI has also had a branch office in Bremen. On February 12, 2007, a branch office was opened in Erfurt, which has since been closed.

The scientific director of the HWWI since March 2022 is Michael Berlemann. Dirck Süß has been managing director of the HWWI since May 2021. Thomas Straubhaar was director of the institute until 2014, and Henning Vöpel until October 2021.

The HWWI produced studies on behalf of the employer lobby organization Initiative Neue Soziale Marktwirtschaft in 2017 and 2018.
