= German National Library of Economics =

Research library of economics

- Deutsche Zentralbibliothek für Wirtschaftswissenschaften (ZBW)

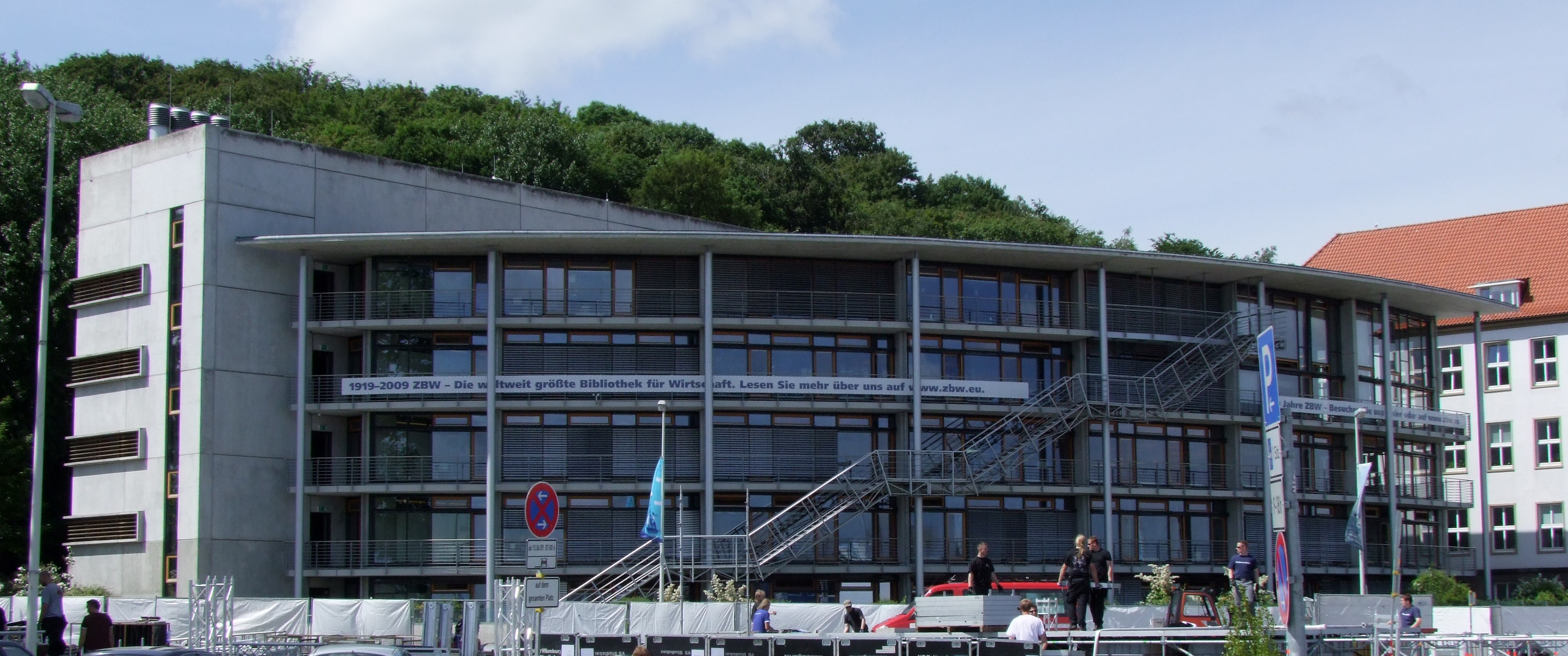
- ZBW main building in Kiel
- Location: Düsternbrooker Weg 120, 24105 Kiel; Neuer Jungfernstieg 21, 20354 Hamburg, Germany
- Type: National library, Research library
- Scope: Economics, Finance, Business
- Established: 1919

Collection
- Items collected: books, journals, electronic media
- Size: 4.43 million items 27,119 journal titles

Access and use
- Population served: researchers, business clients, students, public

Other information
- Budget: €22.56 million
- Director: Klaus Tochtermann
- Employees: 280
- Website: www.zbw.eu
German National Library of Economics
German National Library of Economics Kiel
- Interactive map of the German National Library of Economics Kiel area
General information
- Location: Düsternbrooker Weg 120, 24105 Kiel
- Coordinates: 54°20′18″N 10°09′22″E
Other information
- Public transit access: Bus 41/42 Institut für Weltwirtschaft
German National Library of Economics Hamburg
- Interactive map of the German National Library of Economics Hamburg area
General information
- Location: Neuer Jungfernstieg 21, 20354 Hamburg
- Coordinates: 53°33′26″N 9°59′33″E
Other information
- Public transit access: U1, Bus 4, 5, 19, 112 Stephansplatz; Railway,, Bus 4, 5, 19, 114 Dammtor; , U2 U4, Bus 4, 5, 19, X3 Jungfernstieg; Railway, Rapid-transit railway (all lines), Underground (all lines) Hauptbahnhof

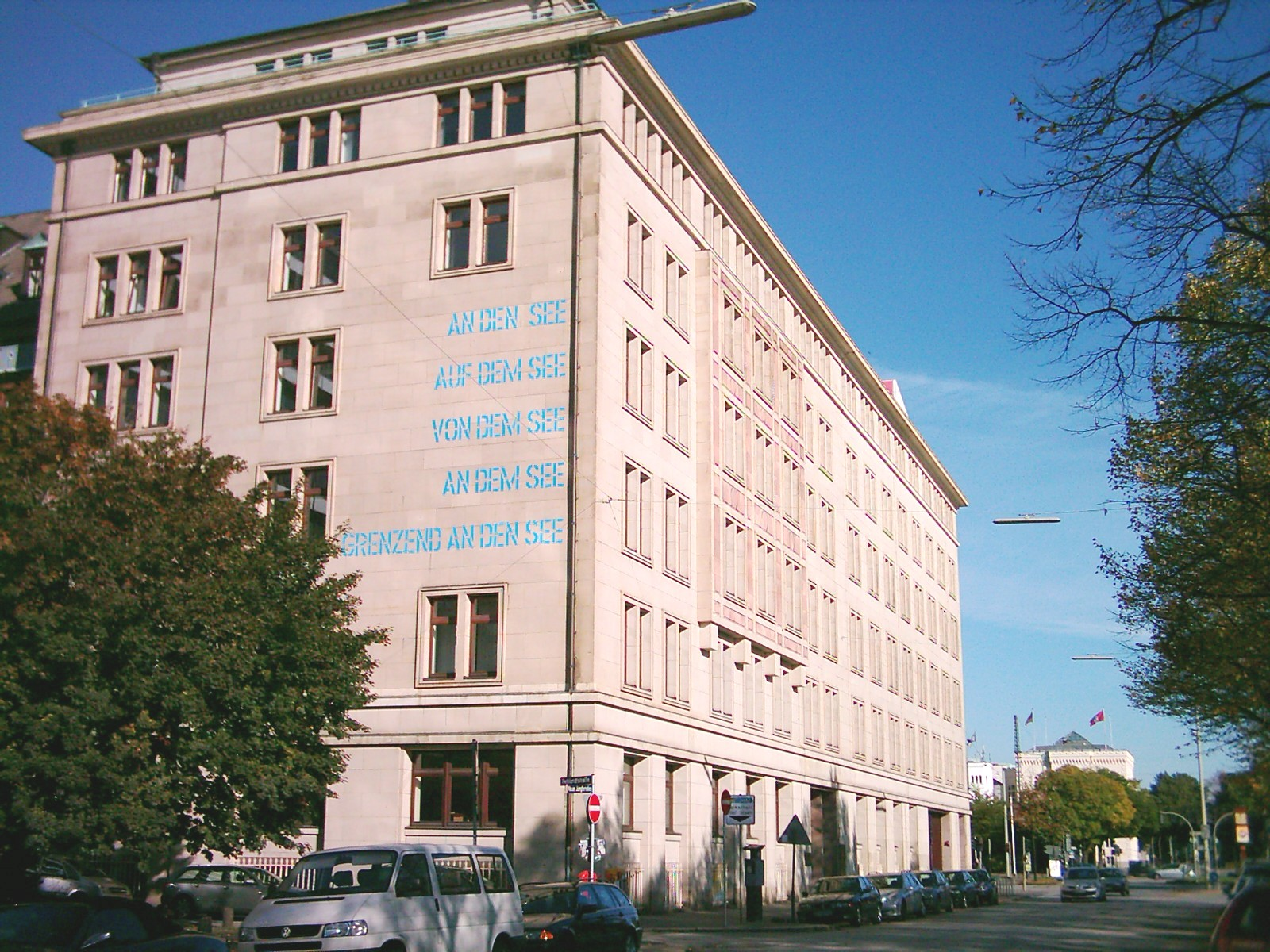
ZBW building, Hamburg

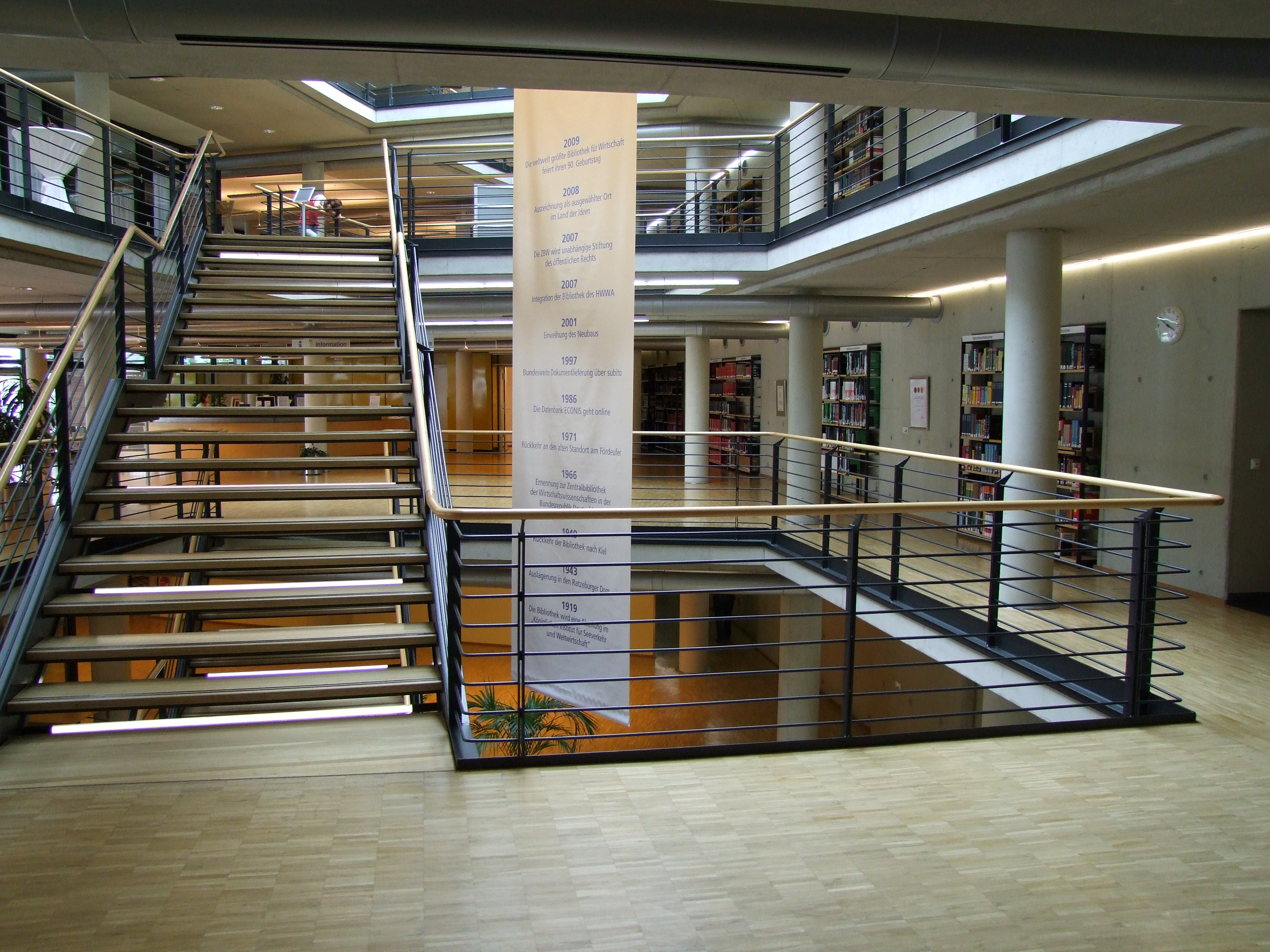
ZBW building interior, Kiel

The National Library of Economics (German: ZBW – Leibniz-Informationszentrum Wirtschaft, "ZBW – Leibniz Information Centre for Economics", formerly: Deutsche Zentralbibliothek für Wirtschaftswissenschaften) is the world's largest research infrastructure for economic literature, online as well as offline. The ZBW is a member of the Leibniz Association and has been a foundation under public law since 2007. Several times the ZBW received the international LIBER Award for its innovative work in librarianship. The ZBW allows for access of millions of documents and research on economics, partnering with over 40 research institutions to create a connective Open Access portal and social web of research. Through its EconStor and EconBiz, researchers and students have accessed millions of datasets and thousands of articles. The ZBW also edits two journals: Wirtschaftsdienst and Intereconomics.

== History ==
The German National Library of Economics – Leibniz Information Centre for Economics (ZBW) was founded on 1 February 1919 as a department of the Kiel Institute for the World Economy. As a research library it has been able to keep its holdings entirely intact. In 1966, the ZBW received the status of a central subject library for economics in Germany, and was admitted to the joint funding system of the Federal and Länder Governments. The ZBW has been a member of the Leibniz Association since 1990. In 2007, the ZBW was separated from the Kiel Institute and established as an independent foundation under public law. At the same time it integrated the library of the Hamburg Institute of International Economics and became the publisher of the journals Wirtschaftsdienst and Intereconomics. Since 2007, the ZBW has two branches in Kiel and Hamburg. Since 2012, it maintains off-site stacks in Flintbek. Application-oriented research in computer and information science was established in 2010. In 2014, the German Library Association (DBV) honoured the ZBW as Library of the Year, calling it "a radically modern library whose customer and innovation orientation can serve as a model for other libraries".

== Collection mandate ==
The ZBW is Germany's central subject library and research infrastructure for economics in Germany. Its mandate is to acquire, to index, and to archive theoretical and empirical literature and subject-specific information from economics and business studies, and to provide access to these materials to the general public on a national basis. The ZBW also acquires all publications from closely related and auxiliary disciplines focussing on economics, in order to accommodate the increasing tendency towards interdisciplinary work in economic research.

The ZBW is part of the system of national literature provision within the German Research Foundation (DFG).

== Library holdings ==
The ZBW holds almost 4.4 million items. The ZBW subscribes to more than 27,100 journals and enables access to 2.3 million electronic documents. The search portal EconBiz gives free access to 10 million datasets. More than 134,000 full-texts (working papers, articles from journals, conference proceedings) from German research institutes and universities are available online and free of charge on the repository EconStor.

The ZBW creates content-descriptive metadata not only for books, but also for articles in journals and working papers, i.e. they are indexed with keywords (descriptors) from the Standard Thesaurus for Economics.

== Services ==
The ZBW maintains the search portal EconBiz containing more than 10 million datasets of bibliographic references for economics and business studies. The ZBW also offers an online reference service, Research Guide EconDesk, which provides guidance for literature and data searches in economics and business studies.

The ZBW is an active player in the Open Access movement which aims for free access to scholarly research output. It is the chief negotiator for national licences in economics in Germany.

The repository EconStor serves as a platform for the free publication of research output in economics. Authors and publishing institutions can publish without charges on EconStor.

More than 400 institutions use EconStor for the digital dissemination of their publications in Open Access. It is an input service for RePEc and one of its most frequently used archives. All titles in EconStor are indexed by search engines such as Google, Google Scholar and BASE, and distributed to databases such as WorldCat, OpenAire and EconBiz.

The ZBW Journal Data Archive is a service for the editors of scholarly journals in economics. Editors can deposit datasets and other material relating to empirical articles and provide access to them in order to enable reproducibility of published research findings.

Wirtschaftsdienst, edited by the ZBW

The ZBW publishes two journals of economic policy, Wirtschaftsdienst and Intereconomics.

The ZBW also provides support for researchers dealing with the different aspects of the digitisation of the science system, such as publishing in Open Access or research data management.

== Projects ==
The ZBW participates in national and international projects to develop new services for its users.

- GeRDI – Generic Research Data Infrastructure. The project aims to develop a distributed and linked-up research data infrastructure. It aims to virtually link existing and future research data centres all over Germany. This allows scientists to search for and re-use research data across disciplines and without barriers. The ZBW coordinates the project which is funded by the German Research Foundation (DFG).
- Linked Open Citation Database (LOC-DB). The project LOC-DB develops tools and processes based on linked data technologies that will enable individual libraries to participate in an open, distributed infrastructure for the indexation of citations. It aims to show that extensive automation of metadata creation can produce relevant added value to scholarly information discovery.
- metrics: MEasuring The Reliability and perception of Indicators for interactions with sCientific productS. The project focuses on gaining a deeper understanding of alternative indicators for measuring scientific performance. Under review are the quality and reliability of the indicators, but also how far they are able to map discipline-specific differences.
- MOVING: the project aims to build a working environment for the qualitative and quantitative analysis of large collections of documents and data. The ZBW is the research partner for text and data mining and also the scientific coordinator, and contributes its expertise in the field of Science 2.0.
- Digital Imperial Statistics: Historical statistics are usually not available online. In this pilot project, the German Imperial Statistics from 1873 to 1883 have been digitised and processed into a format that researchers can download easily for re-use in spreadsheets. This project is also funded by the German Research Foundation (DFG).
- Digital preservation: Because of the rapid technical development of recent years, information is often only available in digital form. At the same time, the hard- and software needed for reading this information becomes obsolete even more rapidly. Digital preservation ensures that future generations will still be able to use this information. To this end, the ZBW cooperates with two other German Libraries, the Leibniz Information Centre for Science and Technology (TIB) and the Information Centre for Life Sciences (ZB MED), in a pilot project to develop strategies and methods for the digital preservation of digital resources.
- Linked Open Data: the project describes the provision of Open Data as Linked Data. The ZBW makes intensive efforts to link its own data with external data in order to find new applications and potential uses. The first ZBW data to be published in this form is the Standard Thesaurus for Economics. Current prototypes can be seen in the ZBW Labs.
- da|ra – The registration agency for research data in social sciences and economics. The ZBW – Leibniz Information Centre for Economics and GESIS – Leibniz Institute for Social Sciences are working together to develop a registration agency where researchers from the social sciences and economics can register the primary data resulting from their research. It also serves to make data accessible, identifiable, and thus replicable, which means that the entire research process becomes more transparent and more efficient. Both the ZBW and GESIS are members of DataCite, an international initiative to establish universal standards for the registration of research data.

== Networks and cooperations ==
In order to meet the challenges resulting from the technological changes in information provision, the ZBW relies on a global network. It has signed cooperation agreements with national and international research institutions, for instance in the context of the Leibniz Research Alliance Science 2.0, the EU project MOVING, and in numerous DFG-funded projects.

The ZBW is also actively engaged in the community of information infrastructure providers, for instance in the working groups of the Leibniz Association, the Common Library Network, LIBER, nestor and the Priority Initiative "Digital Information".

== Research ==
The ZBW carries out application-oriented research in computer and information science. Three professors work with an international and interdisciplinary team of researchers on the subject of Open Science / Science 2.0.

Open Science / Science 2.0 describes the changes that the World Wide Web and its numerous Web 2.0 applications engender in the research and publication processes of the science system, which are the subject of research at the ZBW. In 2013, the ZBW initiated the Leibniz Research Alliance Science 2.0. This Europe-wide cooperation of infrastructure providers and research institutes wants to establish the topic of Open Science in the scholarly community.

The goal is to provide open access to, and use of, scientific findings and processes. An annual international conference (Open Science Conference) offers opportunities for researchers, librarians, and experts in science policy to share applications, experiences and strategies around the complex of Open Science.

== Activities in science policy ==
The ZBW not only researches the digital shift, it also actively shapes it through its national and international activities in science policy. The director of the ZBW is an active proponent of Open Science as a member of the High Level Expert Group promoting the European Open Science Cloud. He is a member of the G7 Open Science Working Group and the German Council for Scientific Information Infrastructures, which is part of the Digital Agenda of the Federal Government. All these bodies prioritise the development of an integrated research data infrastructure across disciplines and countries. The latest project in this context is German Research Data Infrastructure GeRDI, which has been initiated in 2016 and is coordinated by the ZBW. It creates cross-disciplinary links between infrastructures for research data and thus new opportunities for multidisciplinary research.

== See also ==
- EconBiz
- Econstor
- German National Library
- German National Library of Medicine
- German National Library of Science and Technology
- List of libraries in Germany
