= German National Library =

Central archival library and national bibliographic centre

- Deutsche Nationalbibliothek

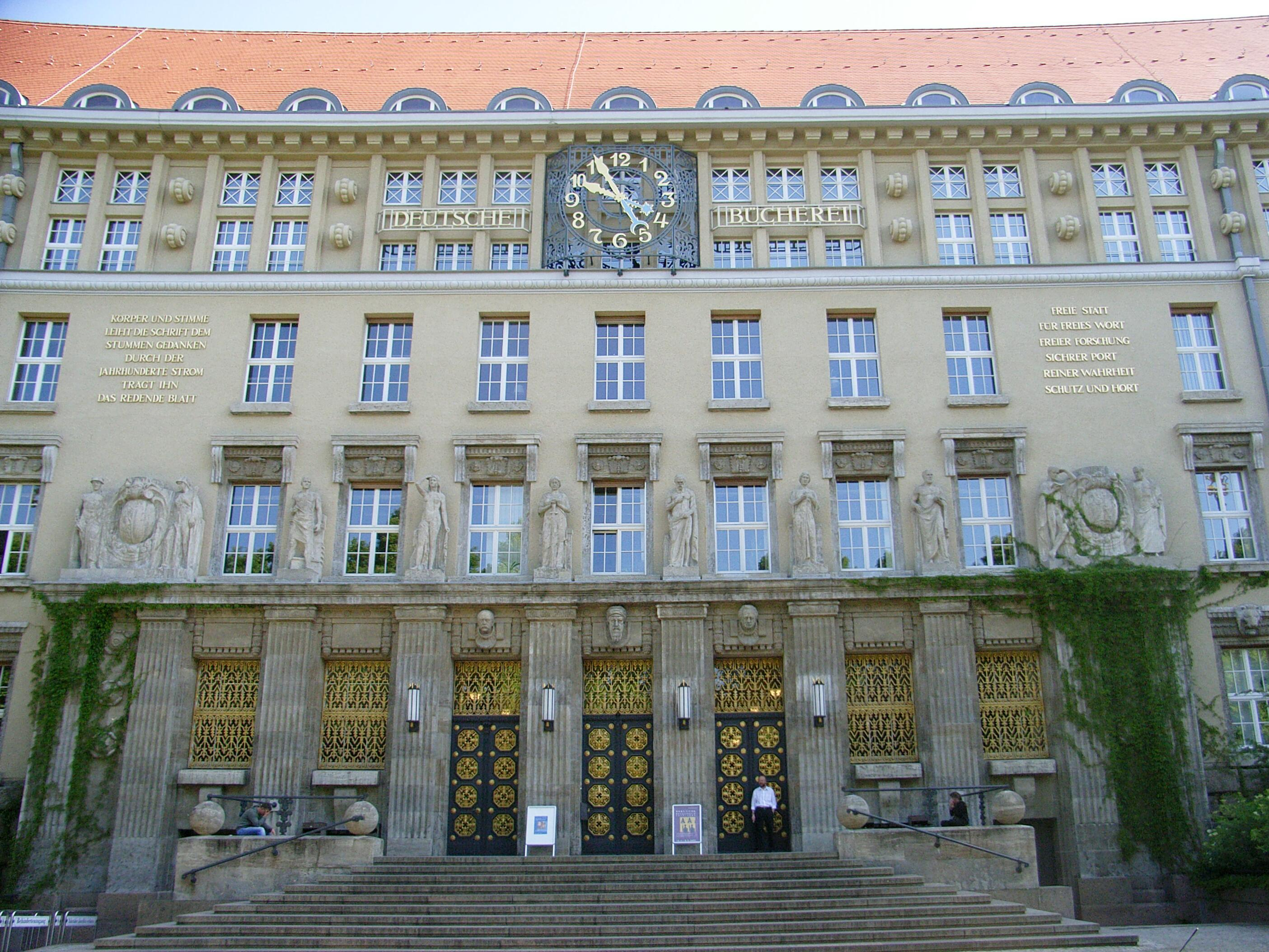
- The German National Library in Leipzig
- Location: Frankfurt and Leipzig, Germany
- Type: National library
- Established: 1912; 114 years ago
- Reference to legal mandate: Law regarding the German National Library

Collection
- Items collected: Conventional printed works, those in microform, sound recording media and digital publications on physical storage devices and net publications
- Size: 43.7 million items (2021)
- Criteria for collection: all publications published in Germany, all German-language publications published abroad, all translations into other languages of German-language works published abroad, all foreign-language publications about Germany published abroad known as "Germanica", written or printed works published between 1933 and 1945 by German-speaking emigrants
- Legal deposit: yes, since 1935

Access and use
- Access requirements: Users must be at least 18 years old and present a valid passport or ID card. Library use is subject to a charge. A valid residence permit for Leipzig or Frankfurt am Main is requested for the application.
- Circulation: 350,713 (2018)
- Members: 173,374 (2018)

Other information
- Budget: €54.9 million (2018)
- Director: Frank Scholze (2020)
- Employees: 641.5 FTE (2018)
- Website: dnb.de
German National Library
Deutsche Nationalbibliothek Frankfurt am Main
- Interactive map of the Deutsche Nationalbibliothek Frankfurt am Main area
General information
- Location: Adickesallee 1, 60322 Frankfurt am Main
- Coordinates: 50°07′52″N 8°41′00″E
Other information
- Public transit: Deutsche Nationalbibliothek; M32 Deutsche Nationalbibliothek
Deutsche Nationalbibliothek Leipzig
- Interactive map of the Deutsche Nationalbibliothek Leipzig area
General information
- Location: Deutscher Platz 1, 04103 Leipzig
- Coordinates: 51°19′20″N 12°23′48″E
Other information
- Public transit: S 1 S 2 S 3 S 5 S 5X Leipzig MDR (400m); Tram 16 Deutsche Nationalbibliothek

The German National Library (DNB; German: Deutsche Nationalbibliothek) is the central archival library and national bibliographic centre for the Federal Republic of Germany. It is one of the largest libraries in the world. Its task is to collect, permanently archive, comprehensively document and record bibliographically all German and German-language publications since 1913, foreign publications about Germany, translations of German works, and the works of German-speaking emigrants published abroad between 1933 and 1945, and to make them available to the public. The DNB is also responsible for the Deutsche Nationalbibliografie and several special collections like the Deutsches Exilarchiv 1933–1945 (German Exile Archive), Anne-Frank-Shoah-Bibliothek and the Deutsches Buch- und Schriftmuseum (German Museum of Books and Writing). The German National Library maintains co-operative external relations on a national and international level. For example, it is the leading partner in developing and maintaining bibliographic rules and standards in Germany and plays a significant role in the development of international library standards. The cooperation with publishers has been regulated by law since 1935 for the Deutsche Bücherei Leipzig and since 1969 for the Deutsche Bibliothek Frankfurt am Main.

Duties are shared between the facilities in Leipzig and Frankfurt, with each center focusing its work in specific specialty areas. A third facility has been the Deutsches Musikarchiv Berlin (founded 1970), which deals with all music-related archiving (both printed and recorded materials). Since 2010, the Deutsches Musikarchiv is also located in Leipzig as an integral part of the facility there.

== History ==
During the German revolutions of 1848, various booksellers and publishers offered their works to the Frankfurt Parliament for a parliamentary library. The library, led by Johann Heinrich Plath, was termed the Reichsbibliothek ("Reich library"). After the failure of the revolution the library was abandoned and the stock of books already in existence was stored at the Germanisches Nationalmuseum in Nuremberg. In 1912, the town of Leipzig, seat of the annual Leipzig Book Fair, the Kingdom of Saxony, and the Börsenverein der Deutschen Buchhändler (Association of German booksellers) agreed to found a German National Library in Leipzig. Starting 1 January 1913, all publications in German were systematically collected (including books from Austria and Switzerland). In the same year, Gustav Wahl was elected as the first director.

Under Nazi rule, from 1933 to 1945, German libraries were censored, becoming extensions of National Socialist rule. Books that Nazis seized in occupied countries entered German collections.

In 1946, Georg Kurt Schauer, Heinrich Cobet, Vittorio Klostermann and Hanns Wilhelm Eppelsheimer, director of the Frankfurt University Library, initiated the re-establishment of a German archive library based in Frankfurt. The Federal state representatives of the book trade in the American zone agreed to the proposal. The city of Frankfurt agreed to support the planned archive library with personnel and financial resources. The US military government gave its approval. The Library began its work in the tobacco room of the former Rothschild library, which served the bombed university library as accommodation. As a result, there were two libraries in Germany, which assumed the duties and function of a national library for the later German Democratic Republic (GDR/DDR) and the Federal Republic of Germany (FRG/BRD), respectively. Two national bibliographic catalogues almost identical in content were published annually.

With the reunification of Germany on 3 October 1990, the Deutsche Bücherei Leipzig and the Deutsche Bibliothek Frankfurt am Main were merged into a new institution, The German Library (Die Deutsche Bibliothek). The "Law regarding the German National Library" came into force on 29 June 2006. The law reconfirmed support for the national legal deposit at this library and expanded the collection brief to include online publications set the course for collecting, cataloguing and storing such publications as part of Germany's cultural heritage. The Library's highest management body, the Administrative Council, was expanded to include two MPs from the Bundestag. The law also changed the name of the library and its buildings in Leipzig, Frankfurt am Main and Berlin to "Deutsche Nationalbibliothek" (German National Library).

In July 2000, the DMA also assumed the role as repository for GEMA, Gesellschaft für musikalische Aufführungs- und mechanische Vervielfältigungsrechte, a German music copyright organization. Since then, music publishers only have to submit copies to DMA, which covers both national archiving and copyright registration. The 210,000 works of printed music previously held by GEMA were transferred to DMA.

== German Exile Archive ==
One of the special activities of the German National Library involves the collection and processing of printed and non-printed documents of German-speaking emigrants and exiles during the period from 1933 to 1945.

The German National Library maintains two exile collections: the Collection of Exile Literature 1933–1945 of the German National Library in Leipzig and the German Exile Archive 1933–1945 of the German National Library in Frankfurt am Main. Both collections contain printed works written or published abroad by German-speaking emigrants as well as leaflets, brochures and other materials produced entirely or in part by German-speaking exiles.

In 1998 the German National Library and the German Research Foundation began a publicly funded project to digitise the "Jewish Periodicals in Nazi Germany" collection of approximately 30,000 pages, which were originally published between 1933 and 1943. Additionally included in the project were 30 German-language emigrant publications "German-language exile journals 1933–1945", consisting of around 100,000 pages. These collections were put online in 2004 and were some of the most frequently visited sites of the German National Library.

In June 2012 the German National Library discontinued access to both collections on its website for legal reasons. The digitised versions are since then available for use in the reading rooms of the German National Library in Leipzig and Frankfurt am Main only, which caused partly harsh criticism. The German National Library cited concerns over copyright as the reason, claiming that although the Library and the German Research Foundation had permission from the owners of the publication to put them online, the ownership of the "orphaned articles", that is, the individual authors, could not be ascertained as would be necessary because German legislation does not include a "fair use clause".

The Jewish German-language newspaper haGalil called the libraries action "overzealous". Yves Kugelmann, the head of Jüdische Medien AG in Zürich, which owns the rights to Aufbau magazine, one of the Exile Archive's offerings, called the action "completely absurd, confusing, and without merit". Anne Lipp of the German Research Foundation concluded that "all projects of the foundation", which have been paid for by public funding and with the intent of publishing online, "must be made public".

Asmus, head of Deutsches Exilarchiv, claims that the ownership of articles from over 13,000 individual authors must first be confirmed and permissions obtained before the 70- to 80-year-old articles may be put online again, despite having had permission from the rightful owners of the publications to put the articles online. Asmus admits that there was not one single complaint of copyright violation. Meanwhile, other German and international institutions such as Compact Memory, the Leo Baeck Institute and archive.org have no such compunctions and have begun restoring many of the deleted periodicals to the internet again. (Note: Compare the major internet sources for Holocaust research, such as Yad Vashem, the United States Holocaust Memorial Museum, and countless other institutions and libraries, all of which increase their internet content every year.)

== Working Group for the Collection of German Imprints ==
The German National Library only collects German imprints from 1913 onward. Because of German's history of numerous kingdoms, creating a unified collection of all printed materials produced in Germany is a challenge. Therefore, the National Library is collaborating with five other libraries who possess large collections in order to coordinate and develop a complete collection of all literature published in German-speaking countries, starting with the year 1400. This group is called the Arbeitsgemeinschaft Sammlung Deutscher Drucke (AG SDD, Working Group for the Collection of German Imprints). The participating libraries and their collection periods are:

- Bayerische Staatsbibliothek in Munich (1450–1600)
- Herzog August Bibliothek in Wolfenbüttel (1601–1700)
- Staats- und Universitätsbibliothek Göttingen (1701–1800)
- Universitätsbibliothek Johann Christian Senckenberg in Frankfurt am Main (1801–1870)
- Staatsbibliothek zu Berlin – Preußischer Kulturbesitz in Berlin (1871–1912)
- Deutsche Nationalbibliothek in both Frankfurt/Main and Leipzig (1913–)

== German Music Archive ==
The Deutsches Musikarchiv (DMA, German Music Archive) is the central collection of printed and recorded music and the music-bibliographic information centre for Germany. It is a Federal agency founded in 1970, tasked with collecting all music published in the country. Its precursor was the Deutsche Musik-Phonothek (1961–1969). The DMA moved to Leipzig in 2010, to be housed in an extension of the Deutsche Nationalbibliothek. Construction work began in 2006 and was completed in 2009.

Formerly situated in Berlin-Lankwitz, the DMA constitutes a department of the German National Library (Deutsche Nationalbibliothek). Publishers of printed and recorded music in Germany are required by law (since 1973) to deliver two copies of every edition to the archive. One copy is kept at the DMA in Leipzig, the second is deposited in Frankfurt.

== German Museum of Books and Writing ==
The German Museum of Books and Writing (Deutsches Buch- und Schriftmuseum) is now hosted at the building in Leipzig. Founded in 1884 as the Deutsches Buchgewerbemuseum (German Book Trade Museum) it eventually made its way to the Deutsche Bücherei Leipzig in December 1925. It is the world's oldest museum of book culture and addresses both experts and the general public. With over one million items in the collection, it is one of the most extensive in the world. They offer a wide variety of services including physical and virtual exhibitions, guided tours, seminars and workshops.

== Building in Leipzig ==
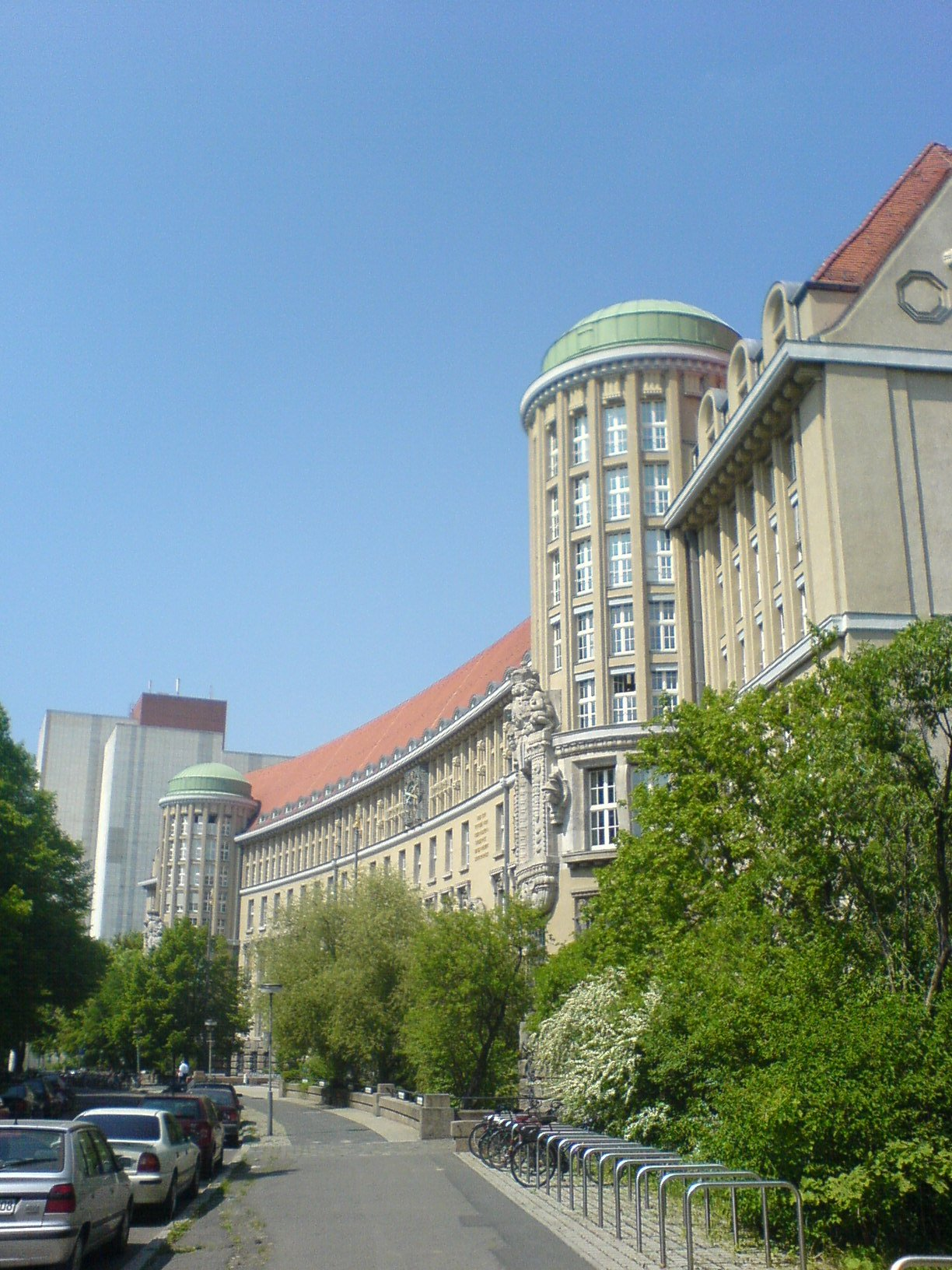
The original building of the German National Library in Leipzig from 1914

The main building of the German National Library in Leipzig was built 1914–1916 after plans of the architect Oskar Pusch. The facade is 160 m long and faces the "Deutscher Platz" (German Plaza). The building was opened on 19 October 1916. The site of the library (near to today's Alte Messe) had been donated by the city of Leipzig, while Friedrich August III, King of Saxony provided the funds for the building. On the facade, the portraits of Otto von Bismarck, Johann Wolfgang von Goethe and Johannes Gutenberg are displayed. Statues represent Technology, Justice, Philosophy, Medicine etc. The central reading room contains a picture by Ludwig von Hofmann, depicting Arcadia in Art Nouveau-style. The staircase displays a mural showing the founders of the German library. The Library also contains the German Museum of Books and Writing. The fourth expansion of the library began in 2007 and was opened to the public on 9 May 2011. Designed by Gabriele Glockler, whose concept for the building was "Cover. Shell. Content." it connects all sections of the building together for the first time.

== Building in Frankfurt am Main ==
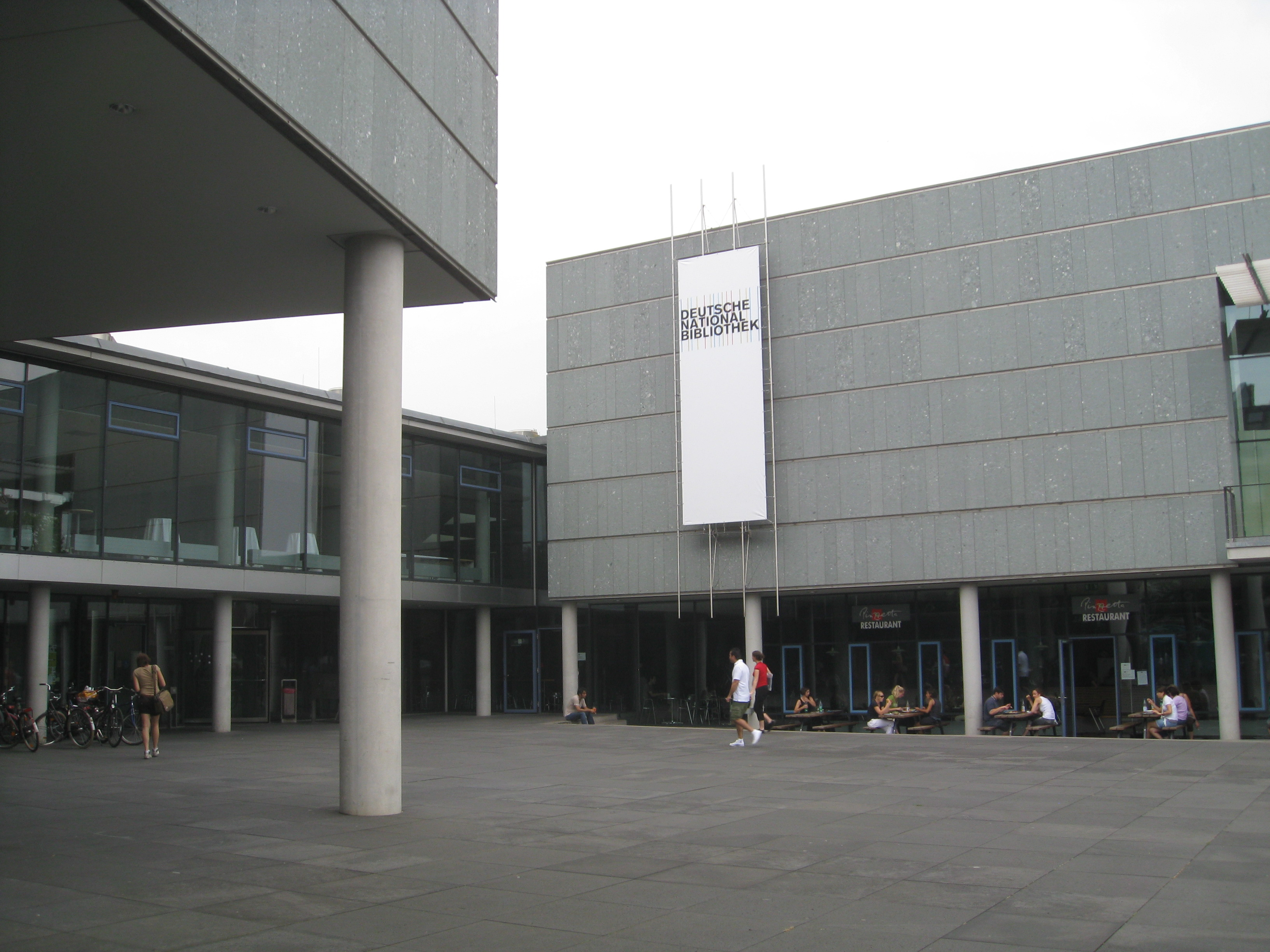
DNB building in Frankfurt

The current building of the Frankfurt branch was officially inaugurated on 14 May 1997. Stuttgart architects Arat-Kaiser-Kaiser were commissioned to design the building after winning an architectural competition in 1984. Planning was delayed however and construction didn't begin until 1992. With an appearance dominated by four main materials: exposed concrete, steel, glass and light Canadian Maple, it features over 300 workstations across three floors, with a large window providing illumination to all of them. Additional storage is located in three levels of underground storage expected to contain enough space until 2045.

== Inventory ==
- Total: 43.7 million items
  - books: 17.3 million
  - journals: 8 million
  - audio records: 2.4 million
  - electronic publications: 10.7 million

== See also ==
- German National Library of Economics (ZBW)
- German National Library of Medicine (ZB MED)
- German National Library of Science and Technology (TIB)
- List of libraries in Germany
- The Collection of German Prints (Sammlung Deutscher Drucke or SDD)
- Gemeinsame Normdatei (GND) (Integrated Authority File)
- Books in Germany
