= Kurt Köster =

German librarian and medievalist (1912–1986)

Kurt Köster, also spelled Koester (born 14 November 1912 in Wiesbaden; died 17 July 1986 in Munich), was a German librarian and historian.

== Life and work ==
Köster was the son of Daniel Köster and his wife Emilie, née Loev. In 1930 he graduated from the Wiesbaden high school on Zietenring and then attended the Pedagogical Academy in Frankfurt am Main. Köster worked as a primary school teacher from 1932 to 1939 then studied history, historical auxiliary sciences, German and musicology in Frankfurt and Munich. On 9 September 1942 he was drafted into the German army. He received his doctorate on 12 February 1944 in Frankfurt on the subject of "The Colmar historical sources of the thirteenth century". At the end of the war he was taken prisoner of war, from which he was released in June 1945.

== Postwar career ==
Köster completed his habilitation in 1947 at the University of Frankfurt am Main with a continuation of his doctoral thesis and has since worked there as a private lecturer in historical auxiliary sciences.He remained an adjunct professor in Frankfurt until 1955 and was honorary professor there from 1971. As a part-time job, he compiled an inventory of the local medieval bells on behalf of the Evangelical Church in Hesse and Nassau. A book about Master Tilman von Hachenburg later grew out of this.

In 1948 he married Ursula Fey. The marriage produced a daughter and a son.

From 1946 to 1948 Köster worked on the editorial staff of the Europa-Archiv magazine. From 1948 to the end of 1949 he was the editor of the humanities literary magazine Erasmus. In 1950 Köster became an employee and in the following year deputy director of the German Library, which was founded in 1946. From 1959 to 1975 he headed this institution (as the successor to Hanns Wilhelm Eppelsheimer), which during his tenure was expanded into an important German-language library and a national bibliographic center. A central task was the introduction of electronic data processing in library operations, with the German Bibliography (DB) being the first national bibliography in the world to have been produced entirely using an EDP system since 1966. - Köster was also responsible for the internationally acclaimed exhibition on exile literature 1933–1945 in 1965. On 30 September 1975 he retired.

Köster researched the signs of pilgrims; the pilgrim sign card index in the German Bell Archive of the Germanic National Museum in Nuremberg. The rest of his academic papers are also located there. With editions and his own monograph, he promoted the work of the Dutch cultural historian Johan Huizinga in Germany and made a name for himself as a Gutenberg researcher. He also worked on regional history with several publications in the association for Nassau antiquity and historical research (Verein für Nassauische Altertumskunde und Geschichtsforschung), becoming a member in 1941. On 4 May 1948 he was elected to the Historical Commission for Nassau (Historische Kommission für Nassau), joining the board in 1965.

Köster was also chairman of the commission for official printed matter in the Association of German Librarians (Verein Deutscher Bibliothekarinnen und Bibliothekare), the culture committee and the specialist committee for documentation, libraries, archives, copyright and statistics of the German UNESCO commission. As a member, he was a member of the Advisory Board of the Prussian Cultural Heritage Foundation, the "Historical Database" working group of the German Research Foundation and the board of trustees of the microfilm archive of the German-language press.

=== Kurt Köster and the Catalog of Feigned Books ===
"Kurt Köster (1912-1986). Köster was the first person to take an interest in objects in the form of books and did so in a remarkably exhaustive way. It is not an accident that Köster was a librarian and bibliographer working in the highest possible post within the German Federal Republic during the years of the Long Boom: from 1951 to 1975, he was head of the Deutsche Bibliothek, first as deputy director and then, beginning in 1959, as director. This institution, which was headquartered in Frankfurt am Main (and which merged after reunification with the Deutsche Bücherei of Leipzig to form the current Deutsche Nationalbibliothek), was in charge of legal deposit of books published in German as well as the ongoing establishment of the German national bibliography."

== Work ==
- Die Geschichtsschreibung der Kolmarer Dominikaner des 13. Jahrhunderts (= Elsaß-Lothringisches Jahrbuch. Band 12). Diesterweg, Frankfurt am Main 1945, DNB-IDN 481676279 (Dissertation, Universität Frankfurt am Main 1946).
- Johan Huizinga 1872–1945. Mit einer Bibliographie (= Eine Bibliographische Reihe des Europa-Archivs. Band 1). Europa-Archiv, Oberursel (Taunus) 1947, DNB-IDN 452506344.
- Die Gemarkungsnamen von Langschied und Hof Schönberg. Flurgeschichte im Spiegel der Flurnamen, Hessisches Landesvermessungsamt, Wiesbaden 1948.
- Meister Tilman von Hachenburg. Studien zum Werk eines mittelrheinischen Glockengießers des 15. Jahrhunderts mit besonderer Berücksichtigung der als Glockenzier verwendeten mittelalterlichen Pilger- und Wallfahrtszeichen. In: Jahrbuch der Hessischen Kirchengeschichtlichen Vereinigung. Band 8, 1957, S. 1–206.
- Neue Studien zu Meister Tilman von Hachenburg und seinen Glocken. In: Jahrbuch der Hessischen Kirchengeschichtlichen Vereinigung. Band 10, 1959, S. 77–91.
- Pilgerzeichen-Studien. Neue Beiträge zur Kenntnis eines mittelalterlichen Massenartikels und seiner Überlieferungsformen. In: Bibliotheca docet. Festgabe für Carl Wehmer. Amsterdam 1963, S. 77–100.
- Pilgerzeichen und Pilgermuscheln. In: Sankt Elisabeth: Fürstin, Dienerin, Heilige. Aufsätze, Dokumentationen, Katalog (der Ausstellung zum 750. Todestag der hl. Elisabeth, Marburg). Sigmaringen 1981, S. 452–459.
- als Herausgeber: Die Deutsche Bibliothek 1945–1965. Festgabe für Hanns Wilhelm Eppelsheimer. Frankfurt am Main 1965.
- Der Einsatz von Computern bei der Herstellung von Nationalbibliographien, dargestellt am Beispiel der Deutschen Bibliographie. Referat, gehalten am 15. September 1966 in Scheveningen auf der 32. Tagung des IFLA General Council, Section of National and University Libraries, Frankfurt am Main ca. 1966.
- als Herausgeber: Exil-Literatur 1933–1945. Eine Ausstellung aus Beständen der Deutschen Bibliothek. Deutsche Bibliothek, Frankfurt am Main 1965.
- Gutenberg in Strassburg. Das Aachenspiegel-Unternehmen und die unbekannte „afentur und kunst“, Gutenberg-Gesellschaft, Mainz 1973.
- Bücher, die keine sind. Über Buchverfremdungen, besonders im 16. und 17. Jahrhundert. In: Börsenblatt für den Deutschen Buchhandel, Frankfurt am Main 1979, S. B 177 – B 256, DNB-IDN 1030649812.

== Literature ==
- Philippe Cordez: Spiel und Ernst der ‚Buchverfremdung‘. Kurt Köster, die Deutsche Bibliothek und die Objekte in Buchform. In: Philippe Cordez, Julia Saviello (Hrsg.): Fünfzig Objekte in Buchform. Vom Reliquiar zur Laptoptasche, Imorde, Emsdetten 2020, S. 10–15.
- Günther Pflug (Hrsg.): Bibliothek, Buch, Geschichte. Kurt Köster zum 65. Geburtstag (= Sonderveröffentlichungen der Deutschen Bibliothek. Nummer 5). Klostermann, Frankfurt am Main 1977, ISBN 3-465-01283-6.
- Jörg Poettgen: Europäische Pilgerzeichenforschung. Die Zentrale Pilgerzeichenkartei (PZK) Kurt Kösters († 1986) in Nürnberg und der Forschungsstand nach 1986. In: Jahrbuch für Glockenkunde. Band 7/8, 1995/96, (erschienen 1997), S. 195–206.
- Hartmut Kühne, Lothar Lambacher, Konrad Vanja (Hrsg.): Das Zeichen am Hut im Mittelalter. Europäische Reisemarkierungen. Symposion in memoriam Kurt Köster (1912–1986) und Katalog der Pilgerzeichen im Kunstgewerbemuseum und im Museum für Byzantinische Kunst der Staatlichen Museen zu Berlin (= Europäische Wallfahrtsstudien. Band 4 / = Schriftenreihe Museum Europäischer Kulturen. Band 5). Peter Lang, Frankfurt am Main u. a. 2008, ISBN 978-3-631-57408-9 (darin unter anderem Wolfgang Brückner, „Kurt Köster und die Pilgerzeichenforschung“, S. 19–29).
- Wolf-Heino Struck: Nekrolog: Kurt Köster. In: Nassauische Annalen, Band 98, 1987. S. 499f.
