= Elisabeth Niggemann =

German librarian (born 1954)

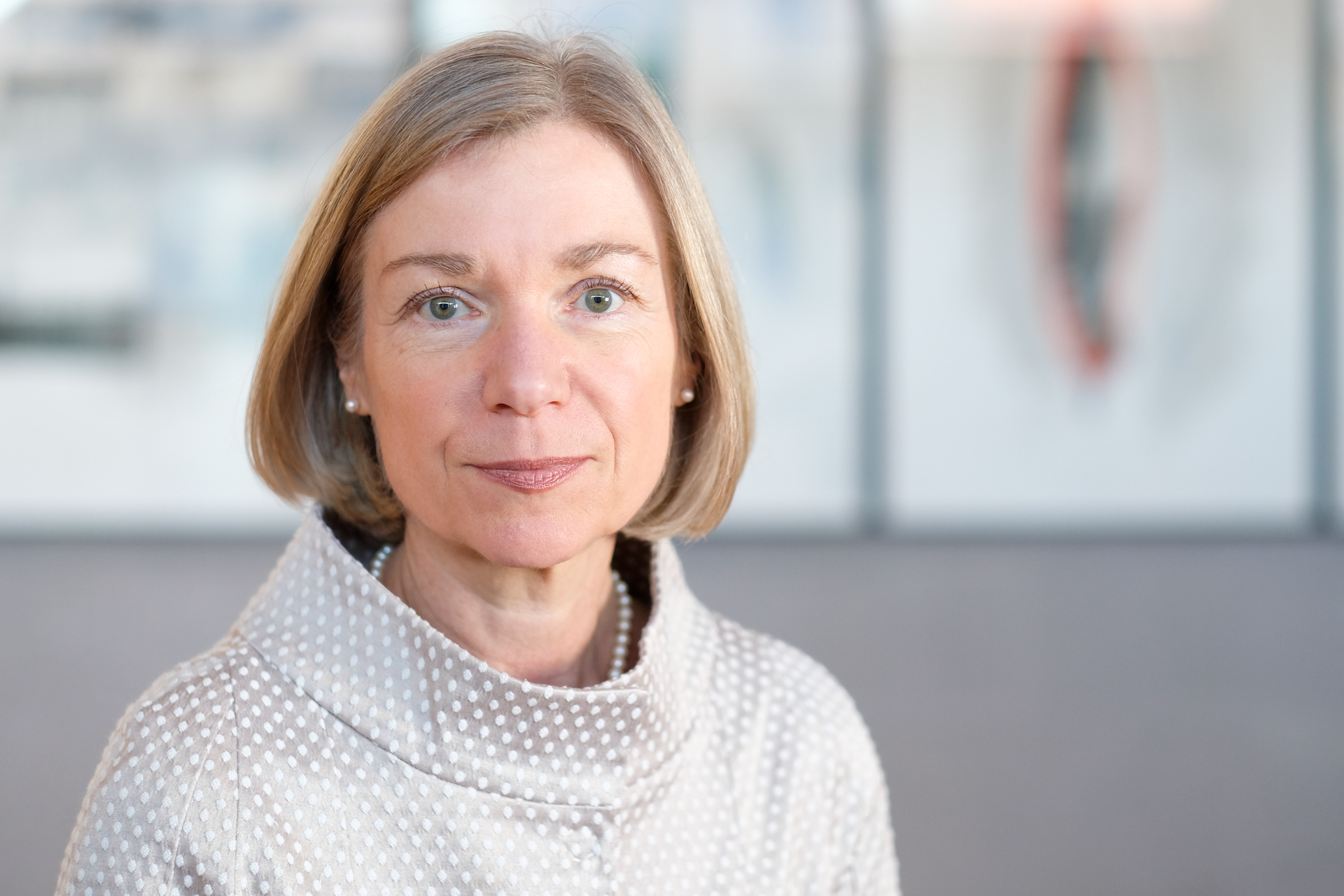
- Born: 2 April 1954 (age 71); Dortmund, Germany
- Education: Ruhr University Bochum
- Occupations: Director General of the German National Library (1999-2019)

Elisabeth Niggemann (born April 2, 1954) is a German librarian specializing in the digitization of cultural heritage resources. From 1999 to 2019, she served as the director general of the German National Library.

== Education and career ==
Elisabeth Niggemann was born in Dortmund on April 2, 1954. In college she studied biology and English, receiving a Ph.D. in biology from Ruhr University Bochum.

Niggemann started her career in libraries in 1987 at the German National Library of Medicine as head of the acquisitions department. In 1989, she became head of cataloguing and subject indexing at the University and State Library at the Heinrich Heine University Düsseldorf; in 1994, she became director of that library. From 1990 to 1995 she also lectured in library and information science at Heinrich Heine University.

Niggemann became the director general of the German National Library in 1999. In 2019, she announced her retirement, with Frank Scholze taking her place as director general as of January 1, 2020.

== Library leadership ==
In 2010, Niggemann was a member of the Comité des Sages, the European Union's high-level reflection group, examining the digitization of Europe's cultural heritage. She chaired the Conference of European National Librarians, a network of Europe’s national libraries, between 2005 and 2011.

She was the first chair of the Europeana Foundation, from 2007 to 2011, helping to launch and consolidate the digital platform for cultural heritage. She was reelected as chair in September 2017, leading the board of the foundation to maintain the sustainability of Europeana.

Niggemann is one of the editors of Zeitschrift für Bibliothekswesen und Bibliographie. She has also written or co-written a number of reports on cultural heritage strategies, including The New Renaissance (2011) and Fachinformationsdienste statt Sondersammelgebiete (2014).

In March 2018, Niggeman was awarded Chevalier of the Ordre des Arts et des Lettres by the French government.
