= Die Pariser Friedenskonferenz (book) =

Bibliography of the Paris Peace Conference

Die Pariser Friedenskonferenz 1919 und die Friedensverträge 1919—1920
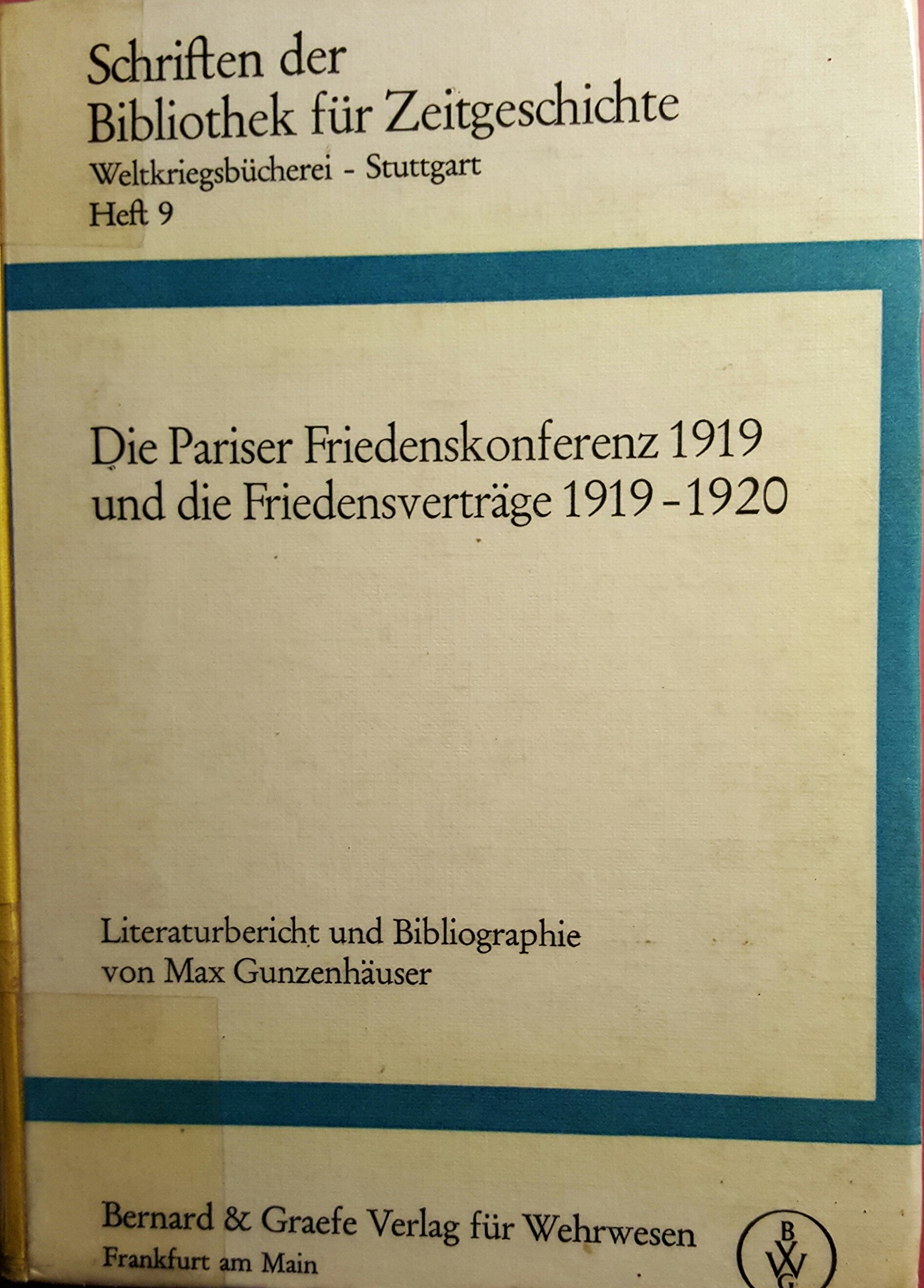
- Author: Max Gunzenhäuser
- Subject: History of the Paris Peace Conference
- Published: 1970 (Bernard & Graefe)

Die Pariser Friedenskonferenz 1919 und die Friedensverträge 1919–1920. Literaturbericht und Bibliographie (The Paris Peace Conference of 1919 and the Peace Treaties of 1919–1920. Literature Review and Bibliography), is a book published in 1970 by the German librarian and historian Max Gunzenheuser; it is a special bibliography of the Paris Peace Conference that contains about 2300 sources published during the preceding 50 years.
