= Paulinerkirche =

Paulinerkirche may refer to the following former church buildings in Germany:

- Paulinerkirche, Göttingen
- Paulinerkirche, Leipzig
