= German Music Archive =

Music archive in Leipzig, Germany

Coordinates: 51°19′20.5″N 12°23′48.1″E

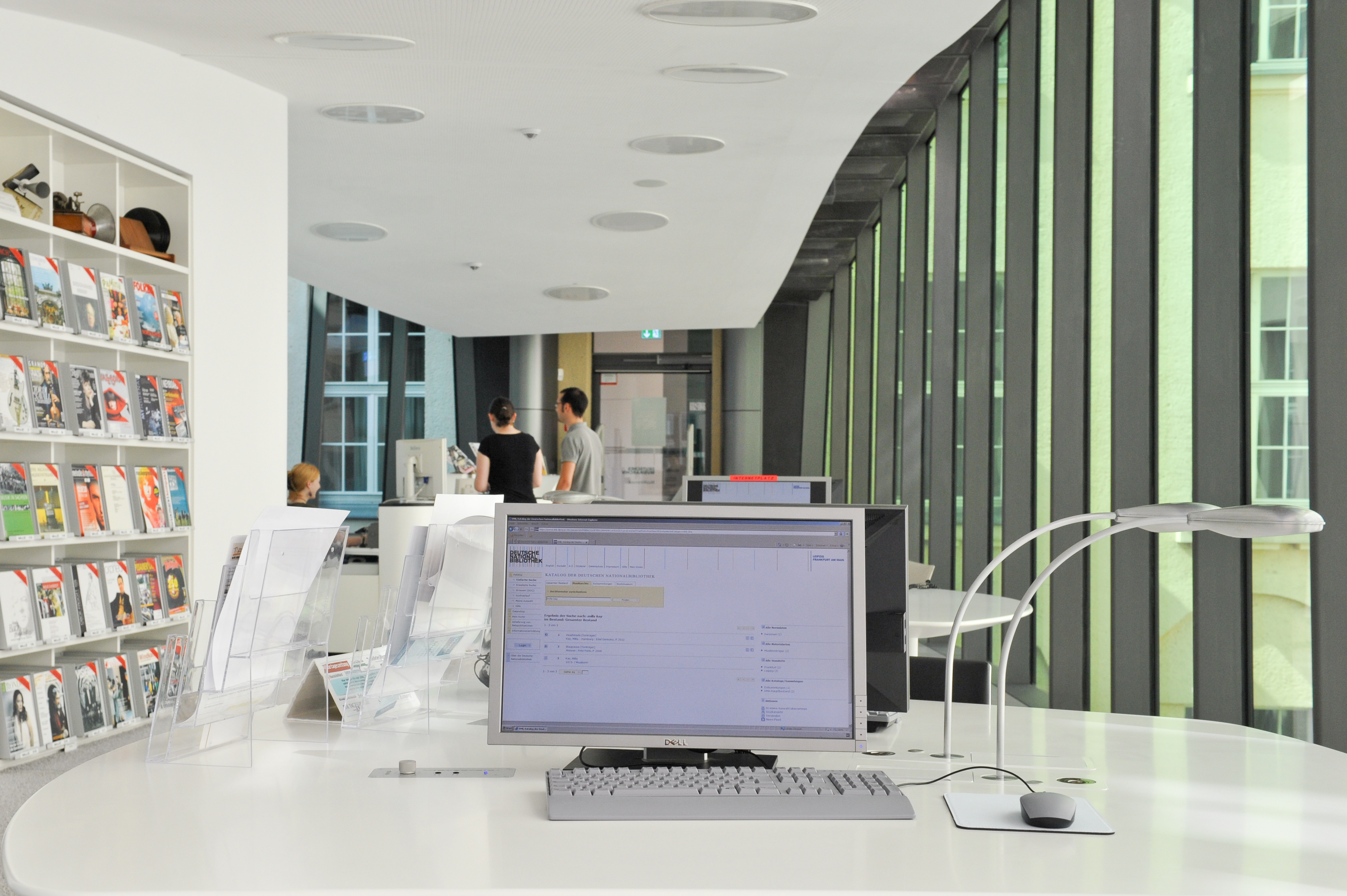
- Reading room of the German Music Archive
- Location: Leipzig
- Established: 1970

Collection
- Size: 2 million

Access and use
- Access requirements: German National Library card

Other information
- Public transit access: S 1 S 2 S 3 S 5 S 5X Leipzig MDR (400m); Tram 16 Deutsche Nationalbibliothek
- Website: www.dnb.de/EN/Ueber-uns/DMA/dma_node.html

The German Music Archive (German: Deutsches Musikarchiv, DMA) in Leipzig, is the central collection of printed and recorded music and the music-bibliographic information centre for Germany. It is a Federal agency founded in 1970, tasked with collecting all music published in the country. Publishers of printed and recorded music in Germany are required by law (since 1973) to deliver two copies of every edition as legal deposits to the archive.

The DMA constitutes a department of the German National Library, Leipzig (Deutsche Nationalbibliothek).

== History ==
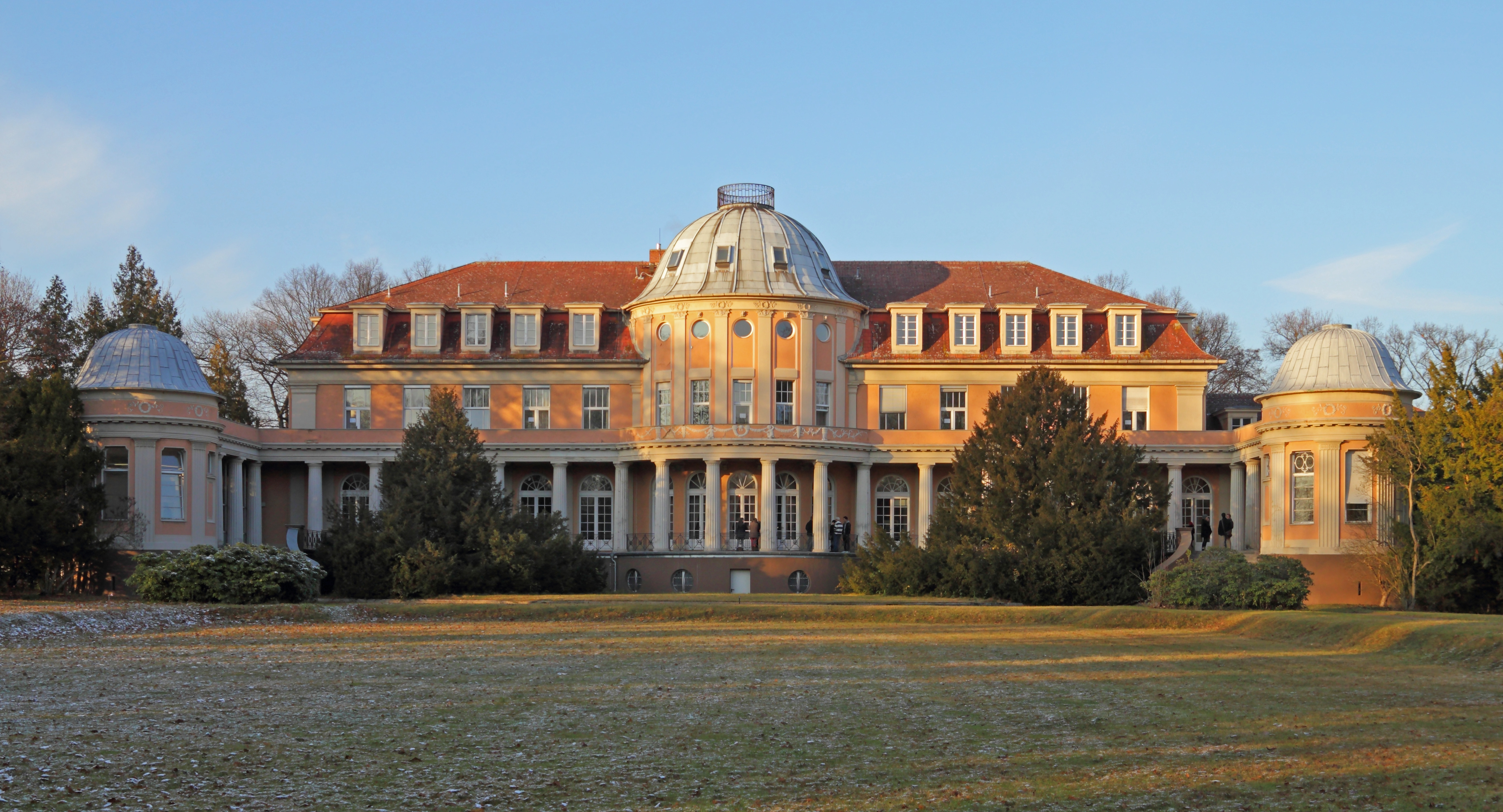
Former host building: The Siemens-Villa in Berlin-Lankwitz

The archive was founded in West Berlin on 1 January 1970, during the division of Germany as a department of Frankfurt am Main based Deutsche Bibliothek—the national library for West Germany. It incorporated its precursor, the Deutsche Musik-Phonothek (1961–1969), and was located (until 2010) at the Siemens-Villa in Berlin-Lankwitz.

In the process of German reunification, the West German Deutsche Bibliothek and the East German Deutsche Bücherei formed one national library with two seats in Frankfurt and Leipzig. The DMA moved to Leipzig in 2010, to be housed in an extension of the Deutsche Nationalbibliothek. Construction work began in 2006 and was completed in 2011.

In July 2000, the DMA also assumed the role as repository for GEMA, Gesellschaft für musikalische Aufführungs- und mechanische Vervielfältigungsrechte, a German music copyright organization. Since then, music publishers only have to submit copies to DMA, which covers both national archiving and copyright registration. The 210,000 works of printed music previously held by GEMA were transferred to DMA.

== Collections ==
Access to the archive is allowed to anyone with a German National Library card.

The library spaces, designed by Gabriele Glöckler include listening booths and exhibition space with temperature control and firedoors.

Users can copy recordings from the archive, such as out-of-print recordings on various formats, onto CDs.

The music archive also offers music bibliographic services. A common authority file is created with personal names, corporate bodies and work titles of the music, which can be made available for research purposes and as a cataloging tool. Until 2012, the DMA controlled uniform subject title files for its own use, which would then be merged into the common authority file. In addition, the German Music Archive has set up a database of loaned musical materials, the Bonn Catalog, which continuously updates the German National Library.

The archive contributes to the Europeana Sounds project, donating over 500 works.

== See also ==
- Berliner Phonogramm-Archiv
