= Frank Scholze =

German librarian (born 1968)

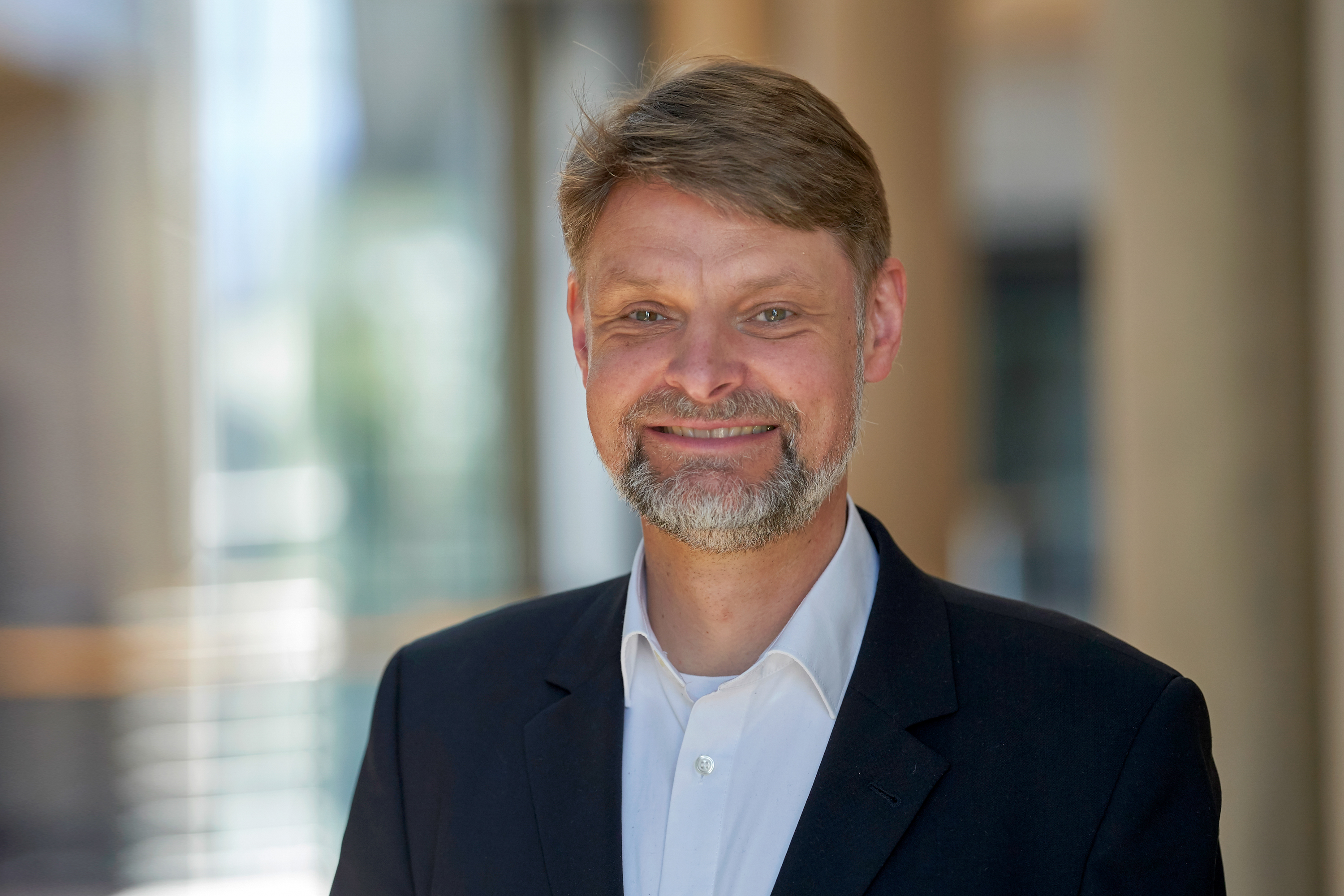
Frank Scholze is Director General of the German National Library

Frank Scholze (born March 6, 1968) is a German librarian. Since January 2020 he serves as the Director General of the German National Library.

== Education and career ==
Scholze studied library and information science at the Stuttgart Media University, as well as art history and English literature at the University of Stuttgart. He started his professional career at the University of Stuttgart Library where he worked as project manager in various projects on digital libraries. Later he also worked there as a subject specialist and Head of the Public Services Department. After serving for two years at the Ministry of Science research and The Arts Baden-Württemberg he was appointed Librarian of the Karlsruhe Institute of Technology (KIT) in January 2010. In 2016 he was elected to the Board of the German Library Association (dbv) and re-elected for a second term of office in 2019.

In April 2019 the State Minister for Culture and Media announced that Scholze will succeed Elisabeth Niggemann as Director General of the German National Library in January 2020.

Scholze is one of the editors of Zeitschrift für Bibliothekswesen und Bibliographie.

== Awards ==
- 2008: German Library Hi Tech Award von Emerald
- 2017: Oberly Award der Association of College and Research Libraries (ACRL)
