= Collection of German Prints =

National library cooperative project

Collection of German Printed Works
- Location: Germany
- Type: Virtual library
- Scope: Entire German-language literature
- Established: 1989
- Branches: 6

The Collection of German Printed Works (German: Sammlung Deutscher Drucke) or SDD is the cooperative group of six institutions who contribute to the virtual German national library. Founded in 1989 by an association of six German libraries this virtual covers the entire German-language literature with the aim of building up, cataloging, making available to the public and preserving for future generations the most complete collection possible of printed works from the German linguistic and cultural area from the beginning of book printing to the present day.

Each library is responsible for a specified period of time:

- 1450–1600: Bavarian State Library (Munich)
- 1601–1700: Herzog August Library (Wolfenbüttel)
- 1701–1800: Göttingen State and University Library
- 1801–1870: Frankfurt University Library
- 1871–1912: Berlin State Library
- since 1913: German National Library

== See also ==
- German National Library#Working Group for the Collection of German Imprints (AG SDD)
