= German Museum of Books and Writing =

Museum in Leipzig

Coordinates: 51.3222°N 12.3966°E

- Deutsches Buch- und Schriftmuseum
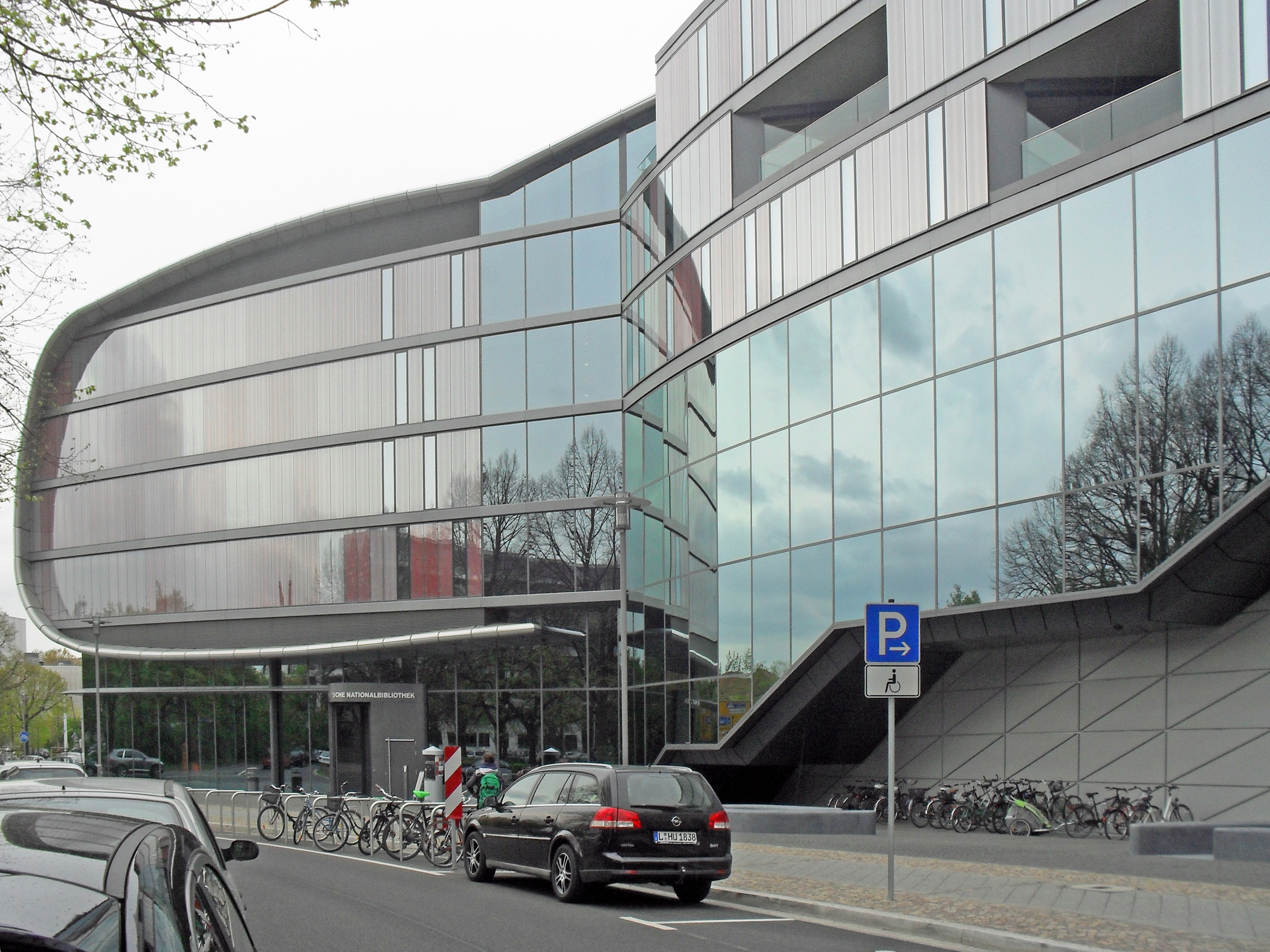
- The 2011 annex designed by Stuttgart architect Gabriele Glöckler
- Former name: Deutsches Buchgewerbe-Museum
- Established: 29 October 1884
- Location: Leipzig, Germany
- Founder: Carl Berendt Lorck
- Website: dnb.de/EN/DBSM/dbsm_node.html

The German Museum of Books and Writing (German: Deutsches Buch- und Schriftmuseum (DBSM)) in Leipzig, Germany, founded in 1884 as Deutsches Buchgewerbe-Museum, is the world's oldest museum of its kind, dedicated to collecting and preserving objects and documents as well as literature connected with the history of books, including paper, printing techniques, the art of illustration, and bookbinding. The museum is housed in a modern €60 million annex to the German National Library in Leipzig built in 2011.

In 1886, the museum acquired the entire book collection of Heinrich Klemm, which he had sold to the Kingdom of Saxony the year before. A rare copy of a 42-line Gutenberg Bible printed on vellum was among the books in the collection. At the end of World War II, the Bible was taken as war booty and transferred to the Russian State Library in Moscow, where it remains today.
