= Deutsche Bibliothek =

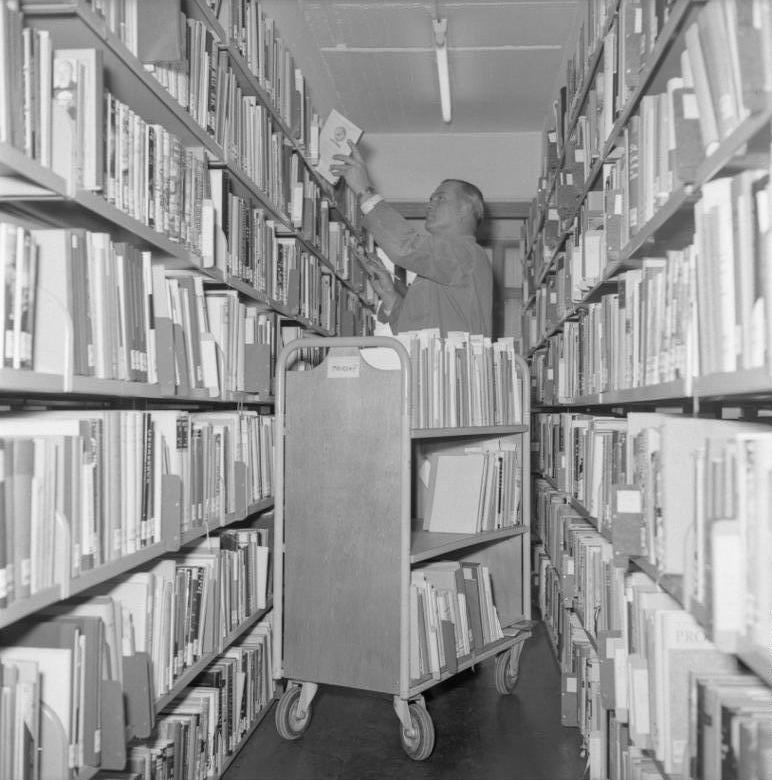
Magazine of the German Library (1960)

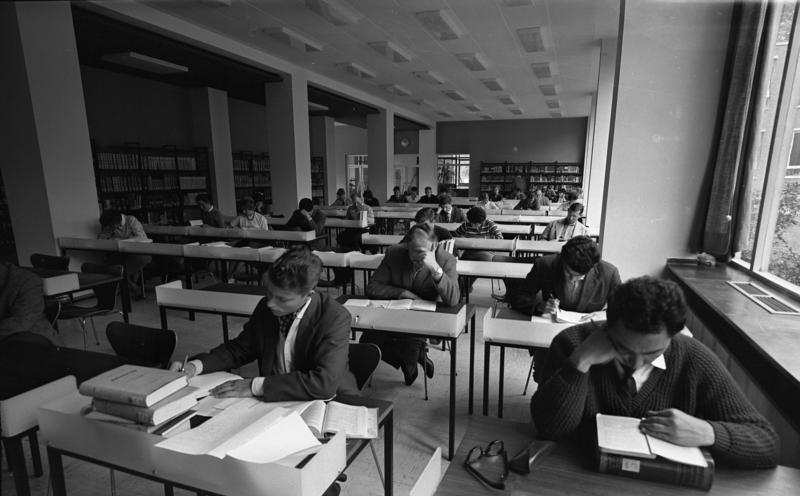
Reading room of the German Library (1960)

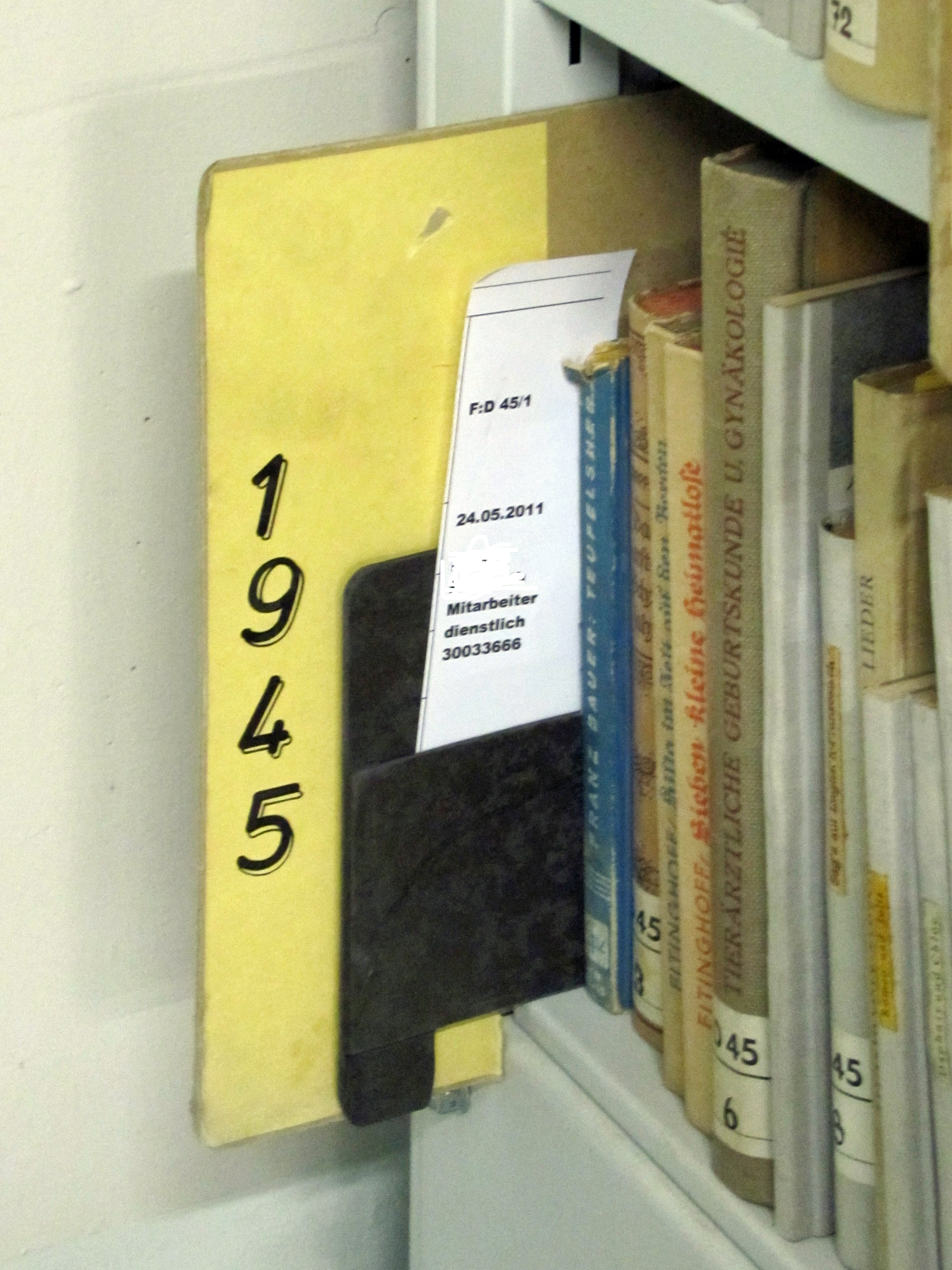
Beginning of the collection after the Second World War in the magazine of the German National Library in Frankfurt am Main

The German Library in Frankfurt am Main (Deutsche Bibliothek abbreviated: DB) was a predecessor of the German National Library (DNB). From 1947 to 1990 it was the West German counterpart to the Deutsche Bücherei in Leipzig, founded in 1912, with the task of collecting German documents and publishing the national bibliography. After the reunification of Germany in 1990, the German Library and the German Library were merged to form "The German Library". Since 2006 it has been called the "German National Library". In 2006, around 8.3 million of the total holdings of the German National Library of 22.2 million units were stored in Frankfurt am Main. At the end of 2011, out of a total of around 27 million media copies, 10 million were archived in Frankfurt.

== History ==
After the defeat of Nazi Germany, Germany was occupied by the Allies and split into parts: the western part, which would later become West Germany, was in the USA-UK-France zone of influence, and the eastern part, which later became East Germany, was in the Soviet Union zone of influence. The German national library, the Deutsche Bücherei (founded 1912) was located in Leipzig, which was then in the Soviet-controlled eastern zone. The western occupation zones called for the creation of a new library in the western zone to replace the library that was now in the Soviet zone.

In September 1946, the American military government approved the creation of a reference library in Frankfurt am Main. Previously also known as the German Library of the West, the German Library began in November 1946 in Frankfurt am Main. Like the Deutsche Bücherei in the now Soviet-controlled zone, the German Library in the western zone was founded by the Börsenverein des Deutschen Buchhandels.

From 1947 onwards, it was legally an institution of the book trade and the city of Frankfurt am Main which attached the library to the city and university library under the direction of Hanns Wilhelm Eppelsheimer. Initially, the library was only responsible for the American and British zones and was housed in the Rothschild Palace on Untermainkai and its neighboring building, the Manskopf House. The cut-off date for the start of the collection was May 8, 1945. The city of Frankfurt am Main provided the premises, the costs were borne by the Börsenverein des Deutschen Buchhandels. Inadequate funding, which, among other things, led to considerations about handing it over to the University of Cologne, the founding seat of the DFG, in the fall of 1949, finally led in 1952 to the conversion of the German Library into a foundation under public law.

The city of Frankfurt and the state of Hesse acted as the founders, the Federal Republic of Germany, represented by the Federal Ministry of the Interior, which saw the protection of society from communist influences as an essential mandate, and the Börsenverein as contributors.: S. 331 In 1952, each institution contributed 60,000 DM (the federal government with 65,000 DM) annually to the financing of the library. In 1954, the contributions were 71 percent higher. The Börsenverein reduced its contributions from 1956.: S. As early as 1953, 337 space problems made it necessary to distribute the holdings to three locations in the city. In 1959, the German Library moved 480,000 units into a new building on Zeppelinallee. Kurt Köster became the new director. The inauguration of the new building was on April 24, 1959 in the presence of Federal President Theodor Heuss. In 1961 the library had 143 permanent positions.

From 1963, the Börsenverein excluded all members who did not submit copies to the German Library from the association. In addition, there was free delivery by the publishers in the German Democratic Republic. In 1965 the library had one million media units. In 1969 the Bundestag passed the "Law on the German Library", which became a federal institution under public law and was subject to legal supervision by the Federal Ministry of the Interior. The donors, the Börsenverein des Deutschen Buchhandels, the state of Hesse and the city of Frankfurt am Main, had withdrawn and the Federal Republic of Germany became the sole support provider. The obligation to deposit (deposit copy) was thus stipulated by law, that is, two copies of every publication published in Germany had to be handed over to the German Library for archiving. In 1970 the German Music Archive in Berlin was attached to the German Library and in 1976 Günther Pflug became the new General Director. In 1971 the Deutsche Bibliothek had 270 posts, the maximum value before the merger with the Deutsche Bücherei was reached in 1981 with 331 posts. The construction of an online catalog began in the mid-1980s: The two libraries in Frankfurt and Leipzig published largely identical national bibliographies until 1990. In 1966, the German Library began to compile its bibliography with the help of the EDP under the direction of the Deputy General Director Rudolf Blum and was able to reduce the long processing times with a significantly smaller personnel expenditure than the German Library and to appear before its Leipzig counterpart.

In the unification agreement of 1990, the merger of the German library with the German library (including the German music archive in Berlin) to form the DDB (The German Library), based in Frankfurt. At this point in time, the German Library and the Music Archive had 4.5 million media units. In the early 1980s, the holdings comprised more than three million volumes and alternative magazines were required. Seven years after reunification and after five years of construction, a new library building was inaugurated in Frankfurt on May 14, 1997, with around 6 million media units.

== Building ==
=== New building in 1959 ===
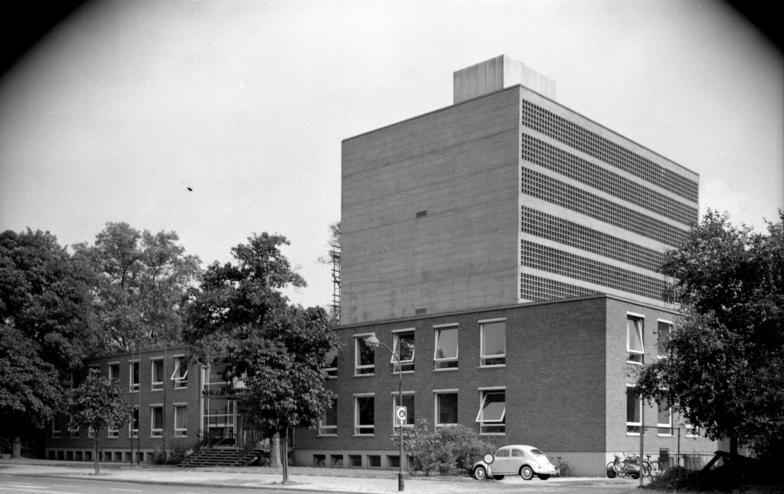
German Library, Frankfurt am Main, around 1959

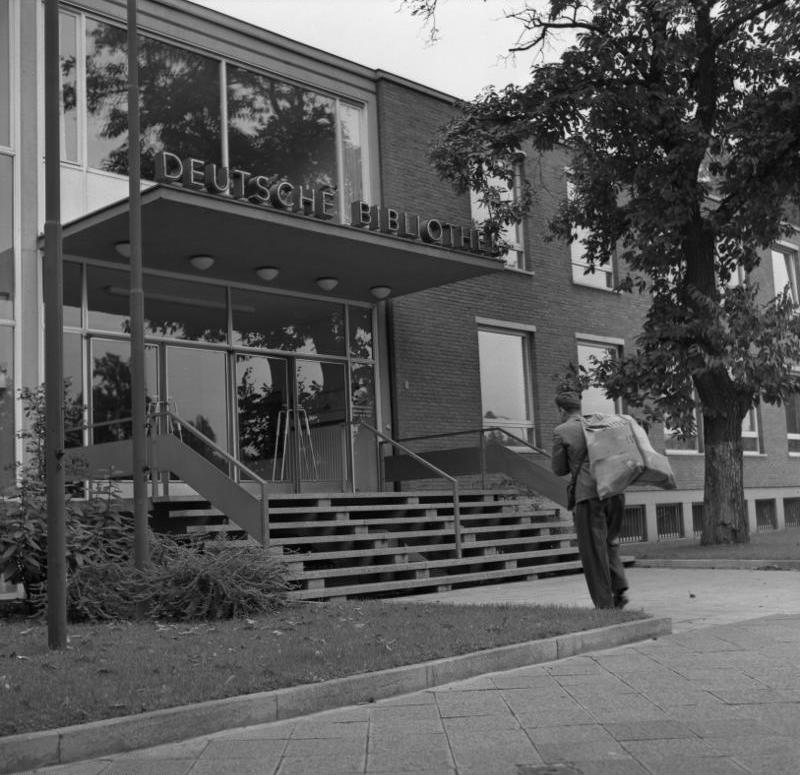
Entrance of the building of the German library

The new building, inaugurated in 1959, was designed by architects Alois Giefer and Hermann Mäckler in the style of post-war modernism. The library buildings cost 2.5 million DM and were financed by the federal government.: They consisted of a storage tower with reading rooms on the two lower floors, which was raised to a height of 43 meters in 1968, and a two-story administration wing with a centrally arranged glass entrance front. In the early 1970s, the library was expanded to include an 18-storey, 53-meter-high book tower. After moving out in 1997, the building complex was used by the University of Frankfurt am Main. In 2004 the property was sold to the Kreditanstalt für Wiederaufbau, which had the ensemble, consisting of two storage towers, an administration wing and an underground car park, demolished for the construction of the West Arcade.

=== New building in 1997 ===
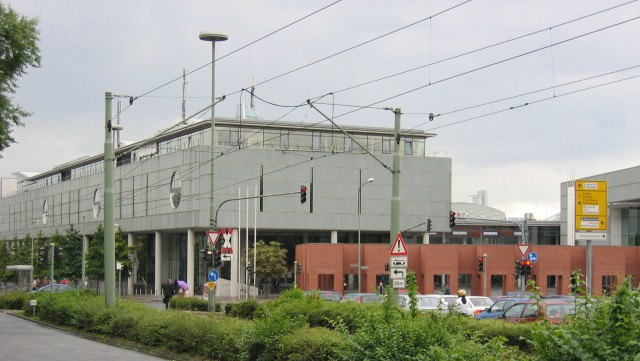
The German Library on Adickesallee in Frankfurt am Main, since 1997

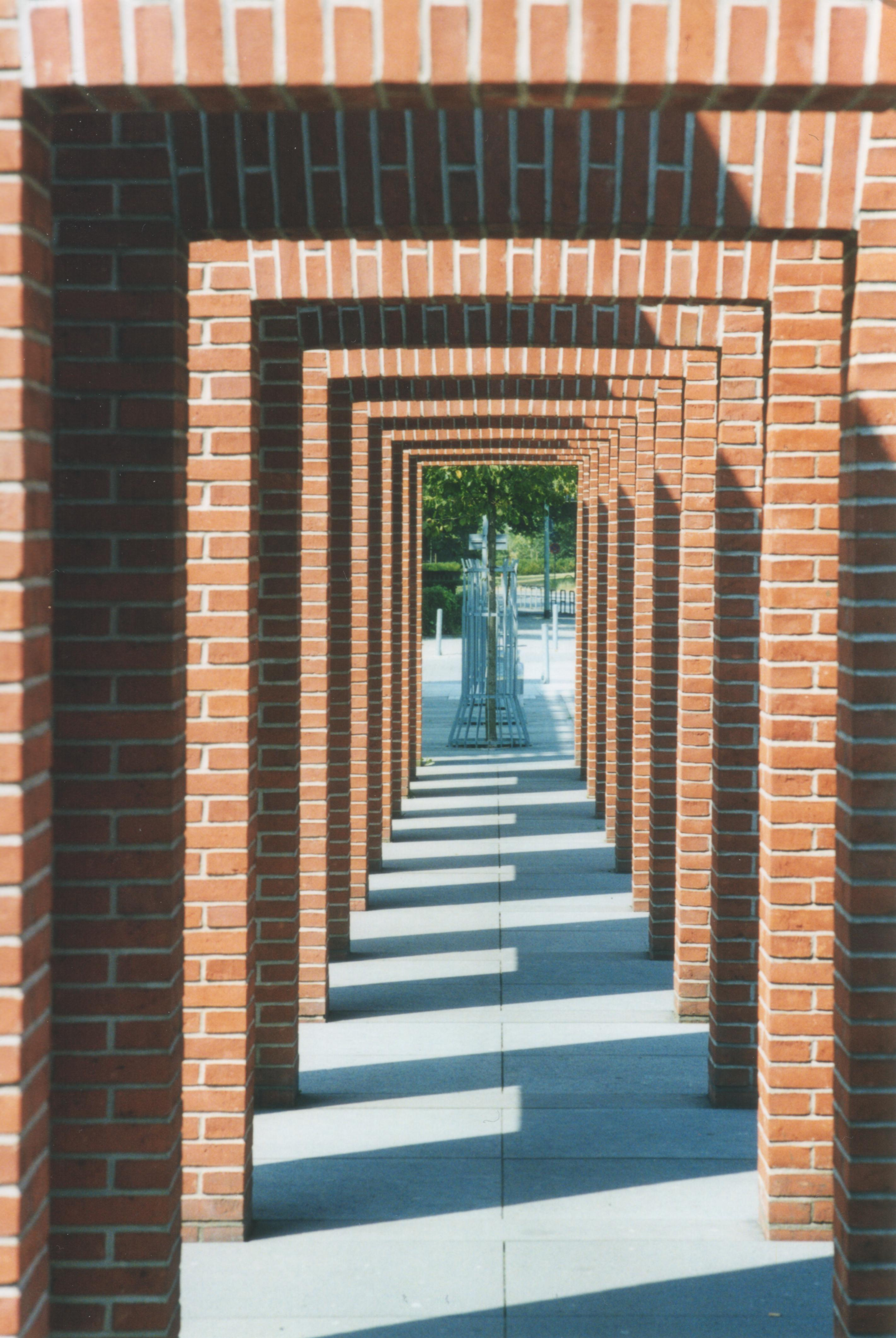
Red brick series of sculptures by Per Kirkeby

The Stuttgart architects Mete Arat, Hans-Dieter Kaiser and Gisela Kaiser won an architecture competition advertised in 1981. In 1985 they also received the planning contract. The new library building opened in 1997 cost 250 million DM. The building at Adickesallee 1 has a main usable area of 47,000 square meters. On its three underground floors there is an air-conditioned magazine area of around 31,000 square meters for 18 million media. The magazine space is sufficient until the 2040s. The storage space can optionally be enlarged by 10,000 square meters of the underground car park. The underground floors lie in the groundwater and are designed as a white tank with an additional external seal, the bottom plate of which is secured against uplift with a layer of 70,000 tons of iron ore and in which a second, internally ventilated concrete tank is built. In 2001 the reading rooms were retrofitted with a ventilation system. A plot of land opposite the library on Adickesallee was secured for the possibility of a later extension. There are a total of 360 reading room spaces.

In the middle of the entrance hall is the sculpture "Armalamor" (1994) by Georg Baselitz. In front of the library is a brick colonnade (1996) by Per Kirkeby.

== Literature ==
- Rau, Christian (2018). "Nationalbibliothek" im geteilten Land die Deutsche Bücherei 1945–1990 (in German). Göttingen: Wallstein-Verlag. ISBN 978-3-8353-3199-0. OCLC 1039527290.
- González, Brigida; Hettlage, Bernd (2012). Deutsche Nationalbibliothek Frankfurt am Main (in German). Berlin. ISBN 978-3-86711-190-4. OCLC 819514449.
