= Frankfurt University Library =

Academic library in Germany

University Library Johann Christian Senckenberg
- Universitätsbibliothek Johann Christian Senckenberg

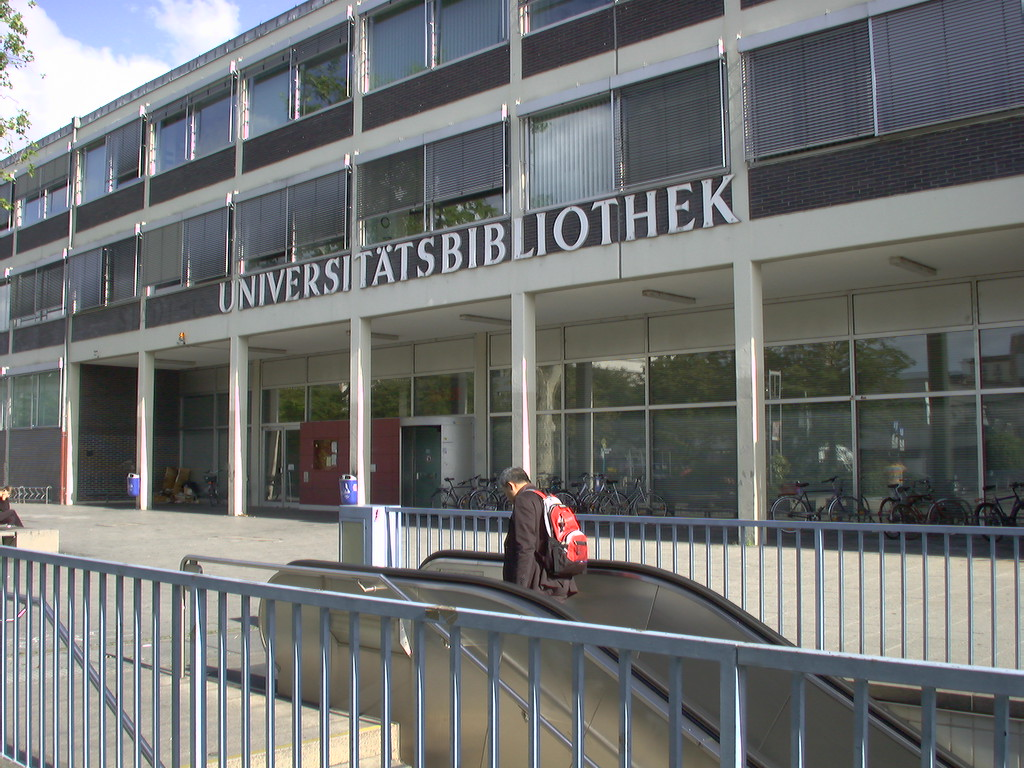
- Central Library Building in 2007
- 50°7′13.4″N 8°39′11.2″E
- Location: Bockenheimer Landstraße 134–138, Frankfurt, Germany
- Established: 1484; 542 years ago (predecessor) 1 January 2005; 21 years ago
- Architect: Ferdinand Kramer
- Reference to legal mandate: Vertrag zwischen dem Land Hessen und der Stadt Frankfurt am Main zur Ergänzung und Änderung des Universitäts-Übernahmevertrages [Contract between the State Hesse and the City of Frankfurt for Complement and Chance of the University Transfer Agreement] (PDF) (StAnz. 25/2000 page 1824, § 4) (in German). 26 March 1999.
- Service area: Hesse and Hessian Interlibrary loan region (Alzey-Worms, Mainz, Mainz-Bingen, Worms)
- Branches: 9

Collection
- Items collected: books, magazines (both print and digital)
- Size: 11.6 million (As of 2023)
- Criteria for collection: scientific literature, all publications published in Frankfurt, all German prints of the years 1801 till 1870
- Legal deposit: Yes, Frankfurt am Main area

Access and use
- Access requirements: Students and employees of Goethe University Frankfurt, also people, who study, live or work for at least 3 months in Hesse or in Hessian Interlibrary loan region; Library card or Goethe card is required to visit the reading rooms
- Circulation: 750,000 (As of 2023)
- Population served: Hesse
- Members: 59,705 (As of 2016)

Other information
- Budget: €25.41 (As of 2023)
- Director: Daniela Poth (since 2020)
- Employees: 209 FTE (As of 2023)
- Public transit access: Bockenheimer Warte; 16 Bockenheimer Warte; 32, 36, 50, N1 Bockenheimer Warte
- Website: ub.uni-frankfurt.de
- References: "Universitätsbibliothek Johann Christian Senckenberg Frankfurt am Main: Übersicht 2023" (in German). 2023.

The Frankfurt University Library (German: Universitätsbibliothek Frankfurt am Main (UB Frankfurt), or Universitätsbibliothek Johann Christian Senckenberg, ISIL DE-30) is the library for the Goethe University Frankfurt, Germany.

== History ==
It originated in the 15th century as a town library and can be dated back to 1484. After the founding of the university (1914) it became the Stadt- und Universitätsbibliothek Frankfurt am Main (StUB). In 1945, the libraries Stadtbibliothek, Rothschild'sche Bibliothek, Bibliothek für Kunst und Technik, Medizinische Zentralbibliothek, Manskopf'sches Museum für Musik- und Theatergeschichte merged. In 2005 the StUB and the Senckenbergische Bibliothek united.

== Library Profile ==
The Frankfurt University Library is one of the largest academic libraries in Germany and a member of the Collection of German Prints, the virtual German national library, covering the years 1801 till 1870. In 2021, the library has had 805,019 visitors. UB Frankfurt is a member of the Hessisches Bibliotheksinformationssystem (hebis) (Hessian library information system).

=== Central library ===
- Zentralbibliothek (central library), Bockenheimer Landstr. 134–138, 60325 Frankfurt am Main (ISIL DE-30) (Library card or Goethe card is required to visit the reading rooms)

=== Branches ===
Sources:

- Medizinische Hauptbibliothek (medicine), Theodor-Stern-Kai 7, Haus 10, 60596 Frankfurt am Main
- Bibliothek Naturwissenschaften (natural sciences), Ruth-Moufang-Str. 2, 60438 Frankfurt am Main
- Bibliothek Recht und Wirtschaft (law and economy), Theodor-W.-Adorno-Platz 4, 60323 Frankfurt am Main
- Bibliothek Sozialwissenschaften und Psychologie (BSP) (social sciences and psychology), Theodor-W.-Adorno-Platz 6, 60323 Frankfurt am Main
- Bibliothek Sprach- und Kulturwissenschaften (linguistics and cultural studies), Rostocker Straße 2, 60323 Frankfurt am Main
- Bibliothekszentrum Geisteswissenschaften (humanities), IG Farben Building (Q1 und Q6), Norbert-Wollheim-Platz 1, 60323 Frankfurt am Main
- Bibliothek für Sportwissenschaften (sports science), Ginnheimer Landstraße 39, 60487 Frankfurt am Main
- Mathematikbibliothek (mathematics), Robert-Mayer-Straße 8, 60325 Frankfurt am Main
- Informatikbibliothek (computing), Robert-Mayer-Straße 11–15, 60325 Frankfurt am Main

=== Collections ===
Since 1802, the library owns an original complete Gutenberg Bible. The UB Frankfurt possesses the largest Judaica and Hebraica collection in Germany.

== Building ==
The modern library building by Ferdinand Kramer was erected in 1964 and inaugurated on 29 April 1965. At the entrance to the reading rooms stands the bronze figure Prometheus by Ossip Zadkine.

== Gallery ==
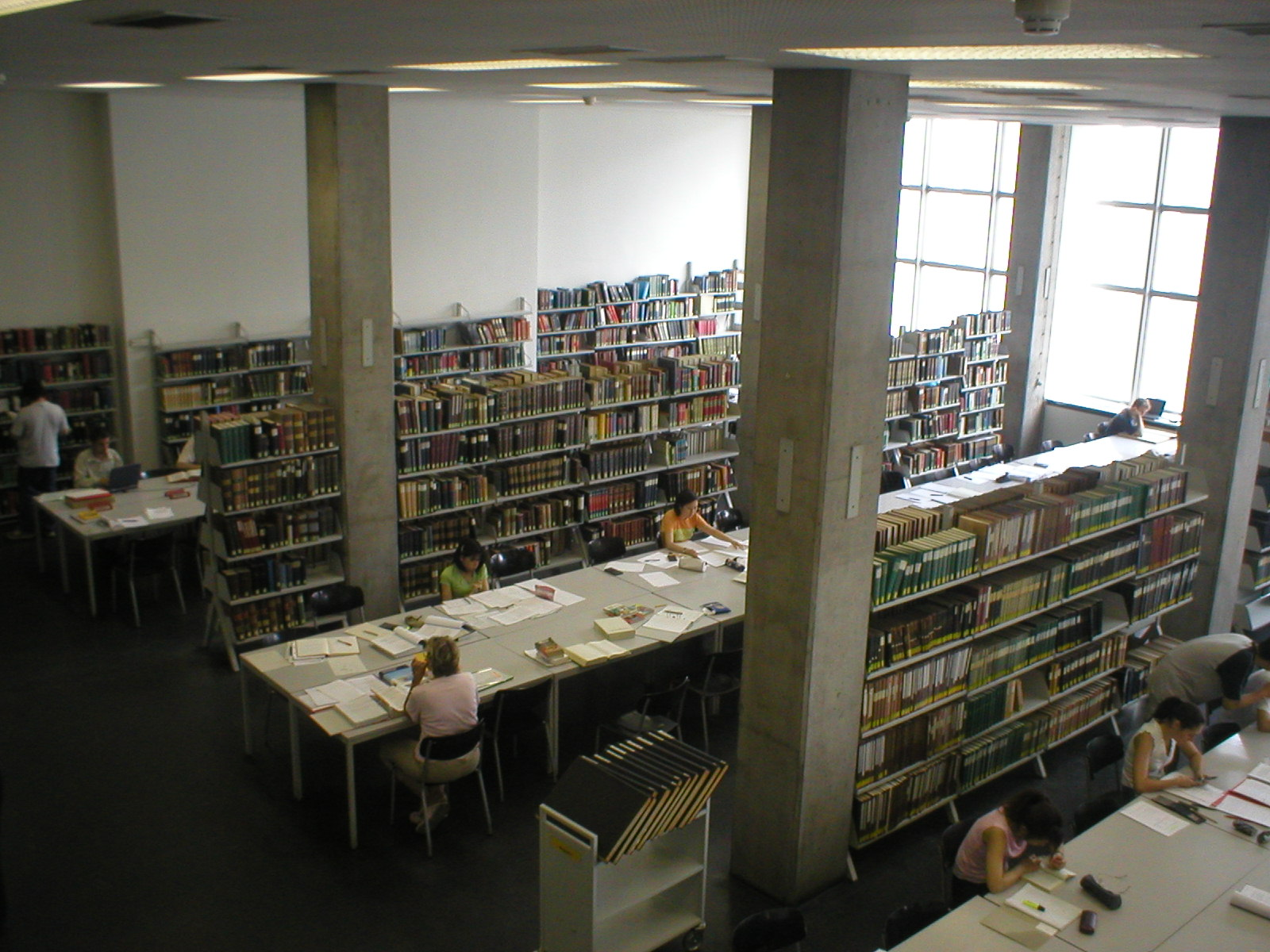
Inside the central library

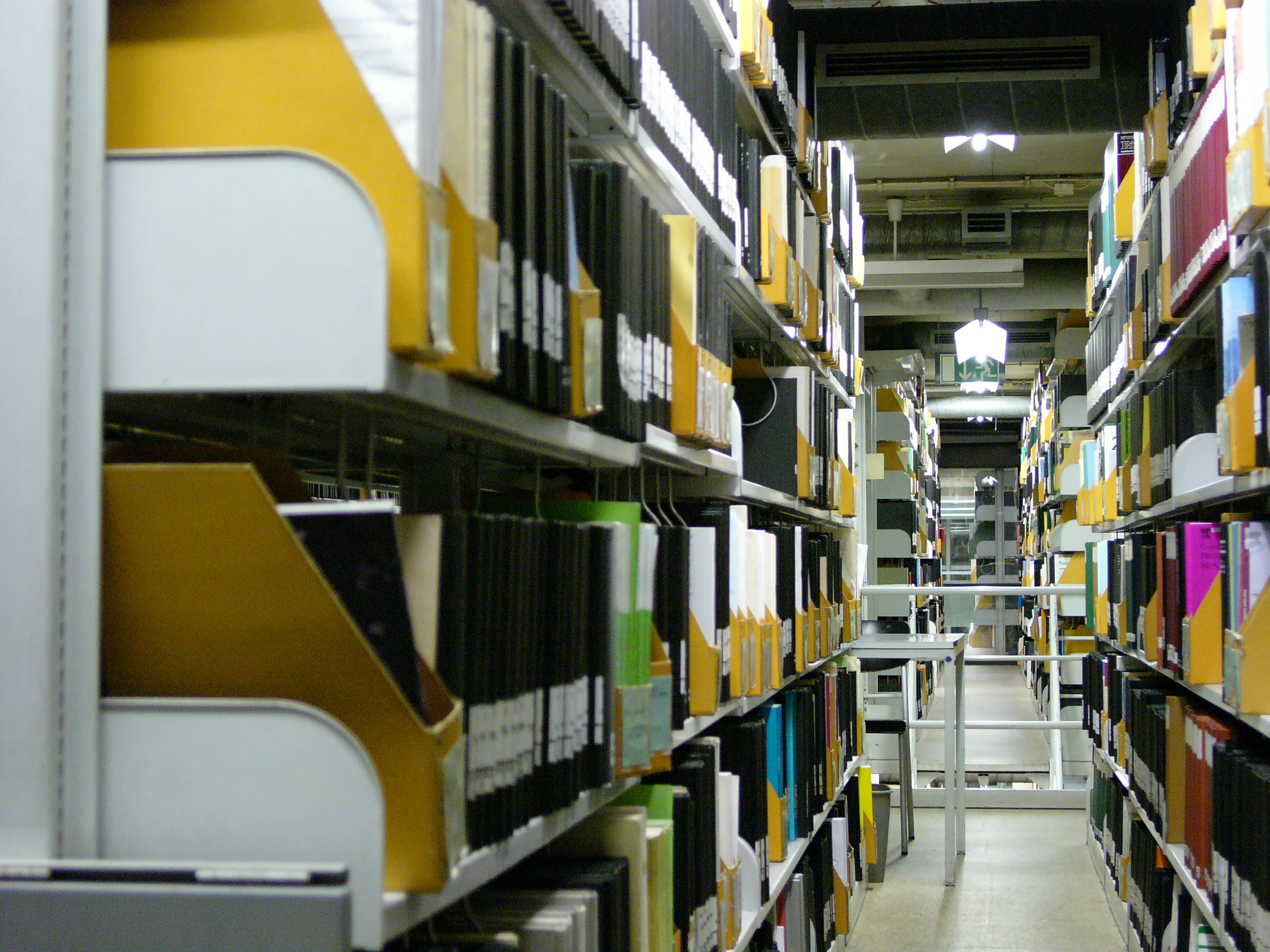
Inside the central library, area accessible to readers

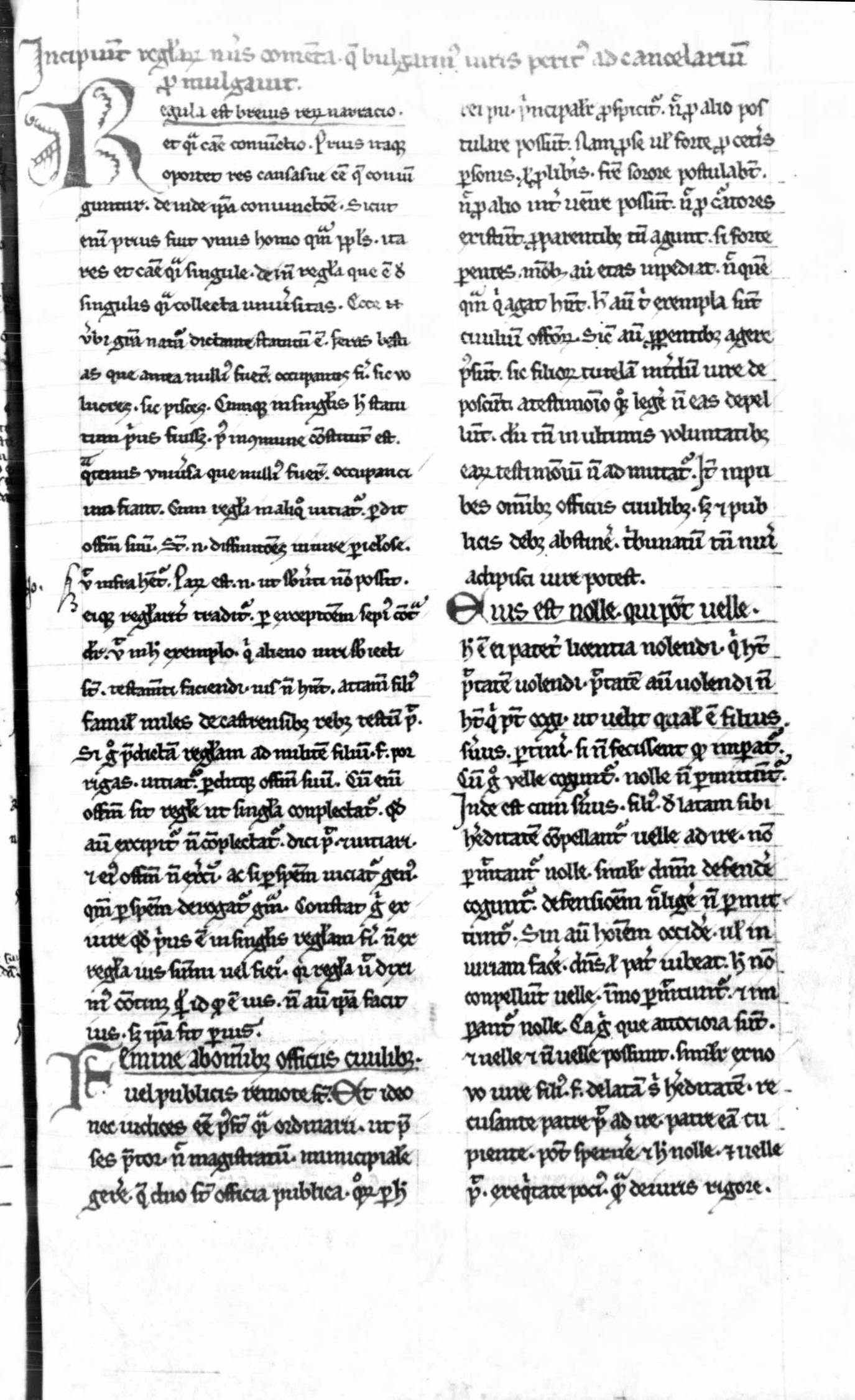
Bulgarus – Apparatus De regulis iuris, 13th-century manuscript
