= HaGalil =

Online magazine

haGalil is an online magazine published in German relating to the issues of Judaism, German Jewry and Israel. It is considered as the most widespread magazine of its kind in German, with over 380,000 monthly visitors (August 2009).

== Overview ==
The magazine was established by David Gall in 1995, and is since then published by him and Eva Ehrlich, both of whom are German-Jews residents of Munich. The magazine operates two offices in Munich and Tel Aviv. According to an interview with the magazine editor conducted in 2001, the main goals of the magazine are to fight anti-Semitism and neo-Nazism on the web, and to supply data regarding Judaism, Jews and Israel. The magazine's motto is publishing a large number of authentic articles in these topics, in order to place hatred and neo-Nazi articles on a lower position in the internet search engines.

HaGalil online presents articles and short communications on various issues related to Jewish life, Jewish history, culture and religion. Additional central topics are Israel and the Israeli-Arab conflict, as well as modern anti-Semitism in German speaking countries. Judaism is presented in a broad sense, including an equal representation for all Jewish religious movements, and it provides a platform for all political opinions in Israel, from classical Zionism to other oppositional groups. Some articles are borrowed from other media and translated from English and Hebrew to German.

In February 2006 the magazine was attacked by hackers probably as a response to the republication of Jyllands-Posten Muhammad cartoons. The magazine editor stated that he does not oppose Islam in any way and personally finds these cartoons tasteless; however, he decided to publish them as a response to the violent reactions of Muslims across Europe after the cartoons' original publication. The magazine is financially supported by donations and advertisements.
