= International Standard Identifier for Libraries and Related Organizations =

Unique identifier standard

The International Standard Identifier for Libraries and Related Organisations (ISIL), ISO 15511, assigns unique identifiers to libraries and related organisations, such as archives and museums.

The Danish Agency for Culture and Palaces had been the international authority for maintaining the standard and its registry. The agency announced that it had stopped being the registration authority.

An ISIL is alphanumeric, with a maximum of 16 characters. Valid symbols are A-Z, 0-9, solidus (/), hyphen-minus and colon.

An ISIL consists of a prefix identifying the authority which issued the ISIL, a dash, and then an identifier issued by that authority. All two letter prefixes are reserved for the ISO 3166-1 alpha-2 country code, followed by an identifier assigned by that country's national library authority. Global-level identifiers can also be assigned, which are not associated with a particular country, e.g. 'oclc-' for the OCLC. The suffix is generally a pre-existing system of identifying libraries; thus, ISIL unifies existing systems around the world rather than instituting an entire system from scratch.
