= Microfilm Archive of the German Language Press =

Library in Germany

The Microfilm Archive of the German Language Press e. V. (Mikrofilmarchiv der deutschsprachigen Presse, MFA for short) is an organization that was founded in 1965 with the intention to archive the printed press, in particular daily newspapers, in microfilmed form. It is headquartered in Dortmund. It is collaborating closely with the Institute for Newspaper Research in Dortmund.
