= Paulinerkirche, Göttingen =

Former church in Göttingen

Coordinates: 51°32′01.62″N 9°55′55.26″E

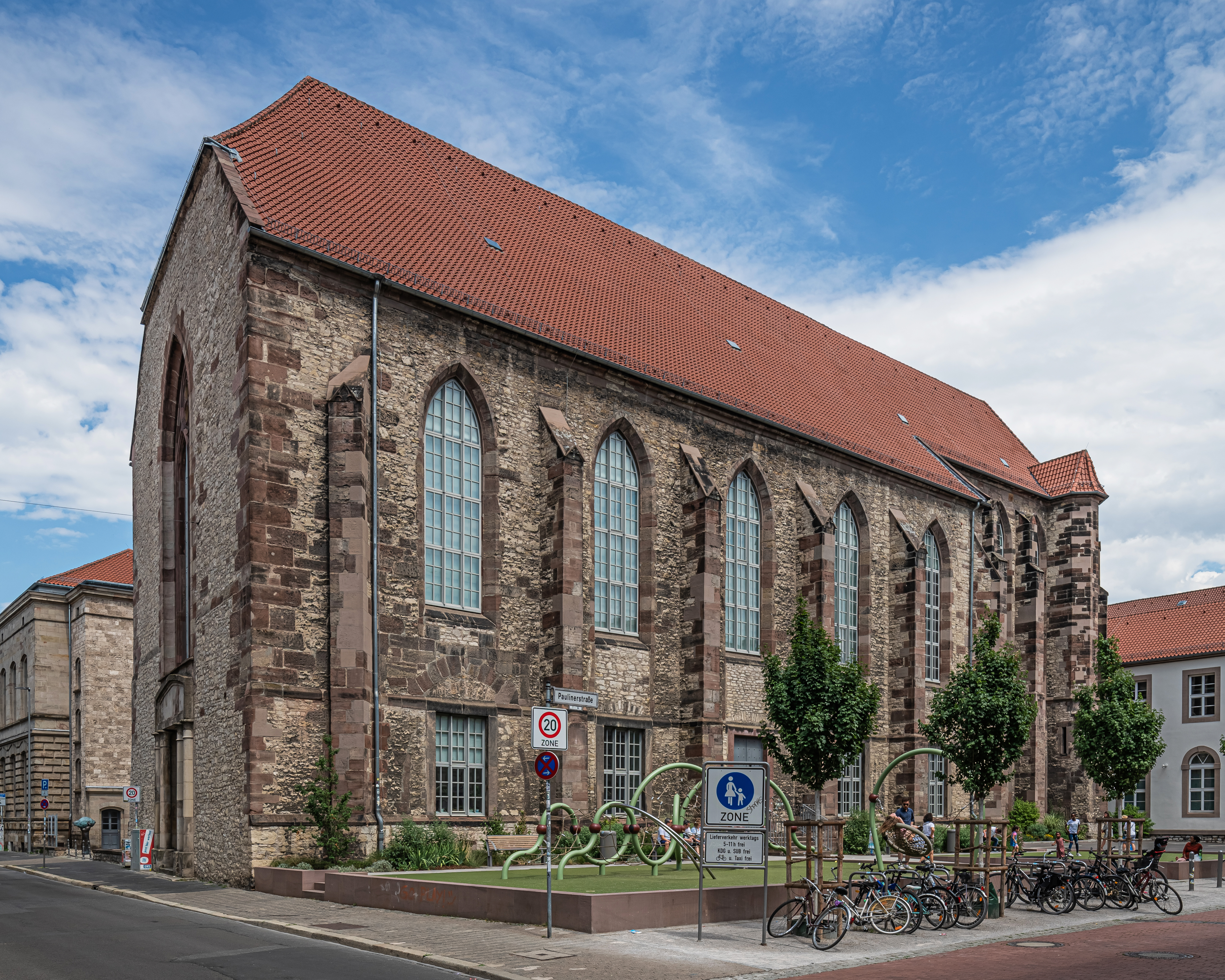
Paulinerkirche

The Paulinerkirche is a former church in the historic city center of Göttingen, Germany, which was completed as a minster in 1304. Today it serves as a convention and exposition centre for the Göttingen State and University Library.

== History ==
In 1294 the Dominican Order was permitted to settle in Göttingen and started to build a monastery in the western part of the city center. The minster was constructed in the style of a gothic hall church typical for the order. Upon completion of the minster the Paulinerkirche became the most ancient gothic hall church in the historic center of Göttingen.

It was dedicated in 1331 to the apostles Peter and Paul. This is the origin of the name of the church. Since 1341 it has been the repository of important relics of saint Thomas Aquinas. These drew great numbers of pilgrims to Thomasmass every year and provided the church with a good reputation even in distant places.

Twelve years after Martin Luther's publication of the 95 Theses, Reformation took hold in Göttingen in 1529. This resulted in hardships for the black friars in the subsequent years. The city magistrate in the beginning did not have full administrative control over the parish churches. These were under the authority of duke Eric I of Brunswick-Lüneburg, prince of Calenberg-Göttingen. He stayed faithful to the old beliefs and did not want to permit Lutheran sermons in his churches. The city magistrate therefore decided the mendicant order's masses would be delivered in the two churches. The largest one of these was the Paulinerkirche, so most of these masses were delivered primarily here. The first regular mass was given by reverend Friedrich Hüventhal against the wishes of the monks on October 24, 1529. Also, in this place the first children in Göttingen were baptized to the Lutheran faith.

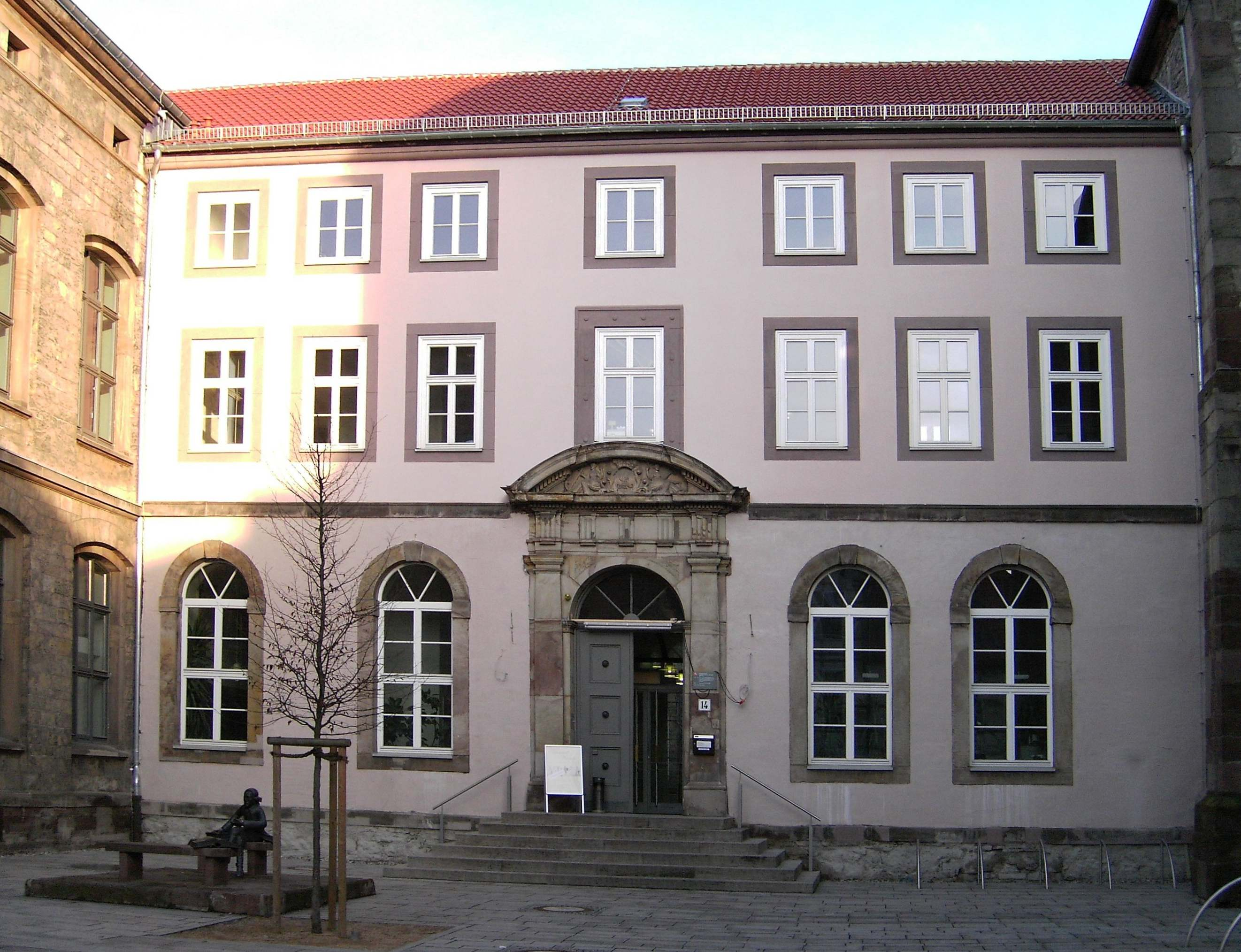
Kollegienhaus

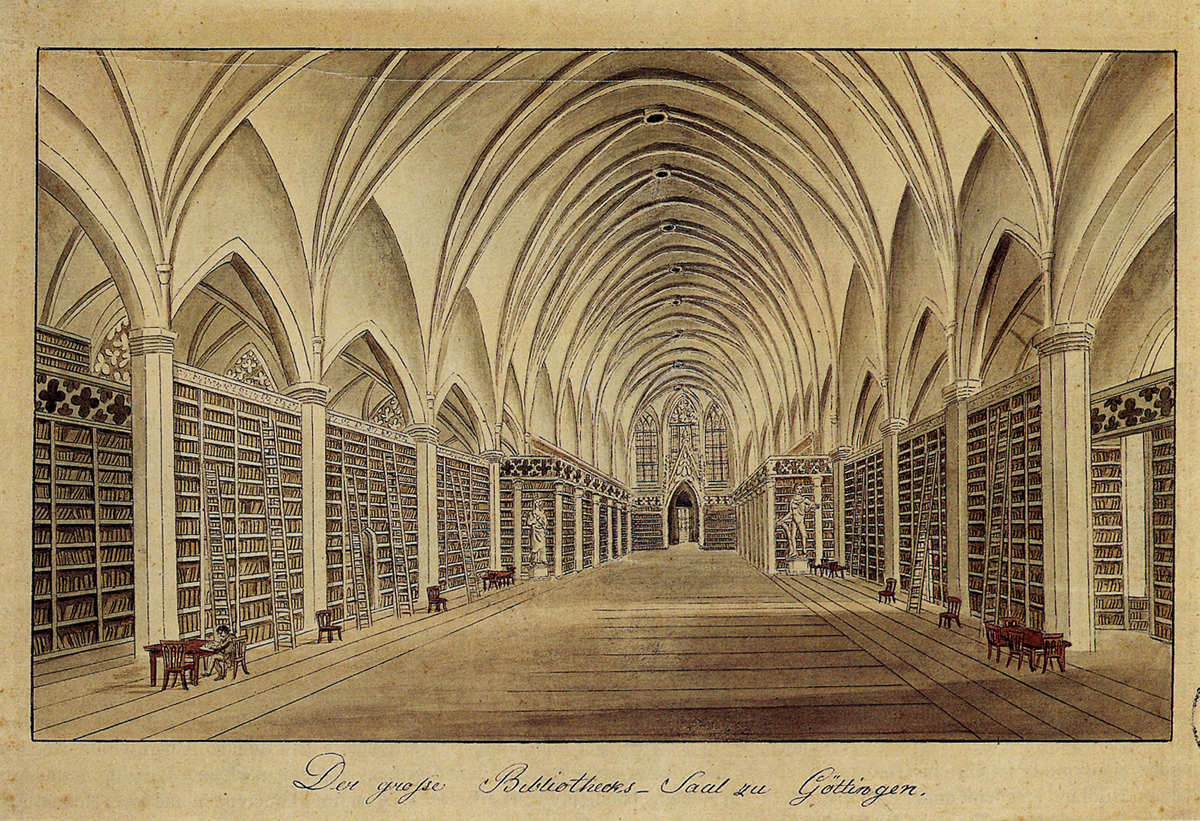
Library hall in Paulinerkirche (ca 1820)

Shortly afterwards the monastery was dissolved, and the building was then used as a paedagogium for educational purposes. This later lead to the establishment of Göttingen University in this building in 1737. A short time before this, the foundation of the university library of Göttingen took place. Masses for the students and academics continued in the church until 1803.

The rapidly growing library resulted in a shortage of available space, so the masses had to move to another place and the library took over all parts of the building. In 1812, under the rule of Jérôme Bonaparte, king of Westphalia, the lower windows were taken down and an additional floor was integrated. The upper part of the church was converted to a library hall.

The church suffered heavy damage in an Allied air raid on November 24, 1944. After World War II the church was rebuilt and the library hall was opened as a lecture hall. Later it was used for the central catalogue of Lower Saxony.

Today, since the 1993 opening of the Central Library of the Göttingen State and University Library on campus, the lecture and exhibition hall covers the entire length of the former church. The monumental hall building, with a length of 52 meters, meets all requirements for modern use, yet retains its ancient character. In spite of several renovations of the church building, it is still almost completely unadorned, inside as well as outside. In the lecture and exhibition hall there are long rows of bookshelves holding some of the books which formed the base for the library in the 18th century.

The Paulinerkirche today is part of a building complex of the Göttingen State and University Library at the site of the former monastery precinct. The stock of books printed after 1900 has been stored since 1992 in the Central Library on campus. However, in the Gründerzeit style building adjacent to the Paulinerkirche remain the manuscript as well as rare and old prints reading rooms, the map collection, the Heyne Hall as well as several storage rooms. The Kollegienhaus (college house) is located between this building and the Paulinerkirche which was constructed as a baroque building between 1734 and 1737 from material of the old monastery. In this building on Papendiek street is one of the two main entrances to the library as well as to the lecture and exhibition hall in the Paulinerkirche on the first floor. In front of the building is a bronze statue of Göttingen professor Georg Christoph Lichtenberg.

== Literature ==
- Wulf Schadendorf, Göttinger Kirchen, Göttingen, 1953
- Elmar Mittler (ed.), 700 Jahre Pauliner Kirche - vom Kloster zur Bibliothek, Göttingen, Wallstein, 1994, ISBN 3-89244-188-X
