= Raumer =

Raumer is a surname. Notable people with the surname include:

- Friedrich Ludwig Georg von Raumer (1781–1873), German historian
  - Friedrich-von-Raumer-Bibliothek, a public library in Berlin
- Hans von Raumer (1870–1965), German politician of the German People's Party (DVP)
- Karl Georg von Raumer (1783–1865), German geologist and educator
- Rudolf von Raumer (1815–1876), German philologist and linguist
