= Haus der Berliner Festspiele =

Theatre in Berlin

Coordinates: 52°29′55″N 13°19′43″E

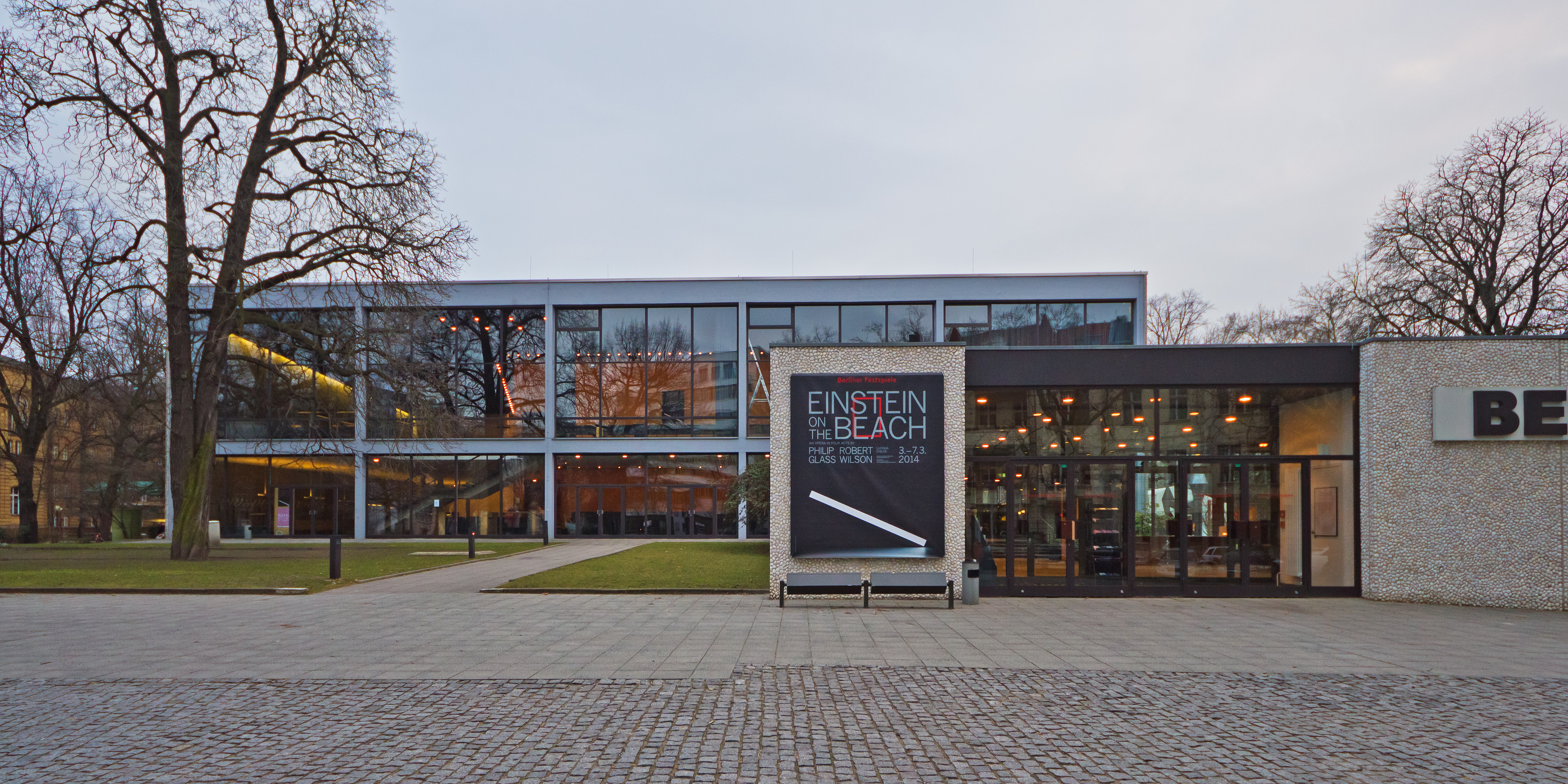
Haus der Berliner Festspiele 2014

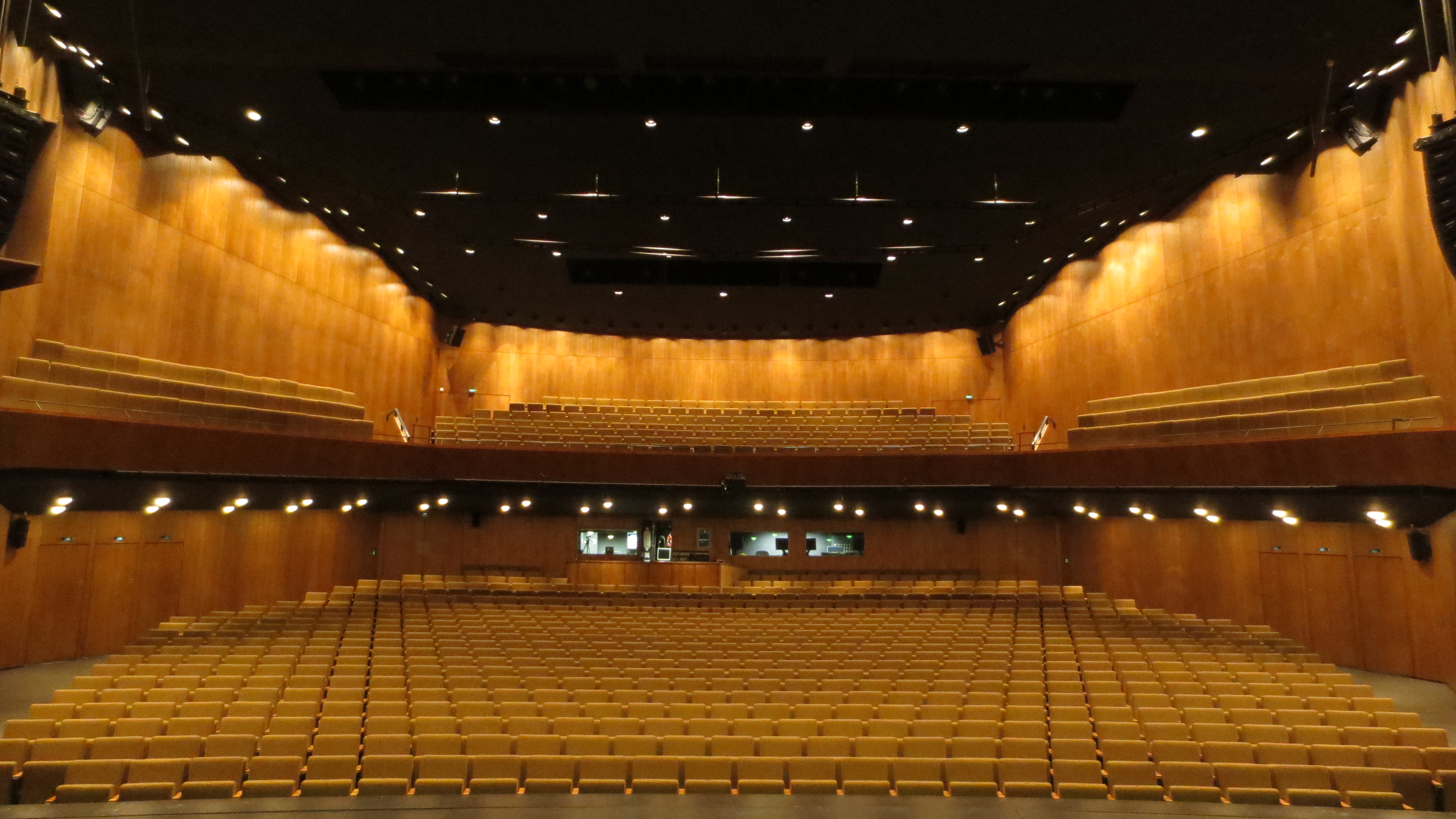
Große Bühne im Haus der Berliner Festspiele im September 2013

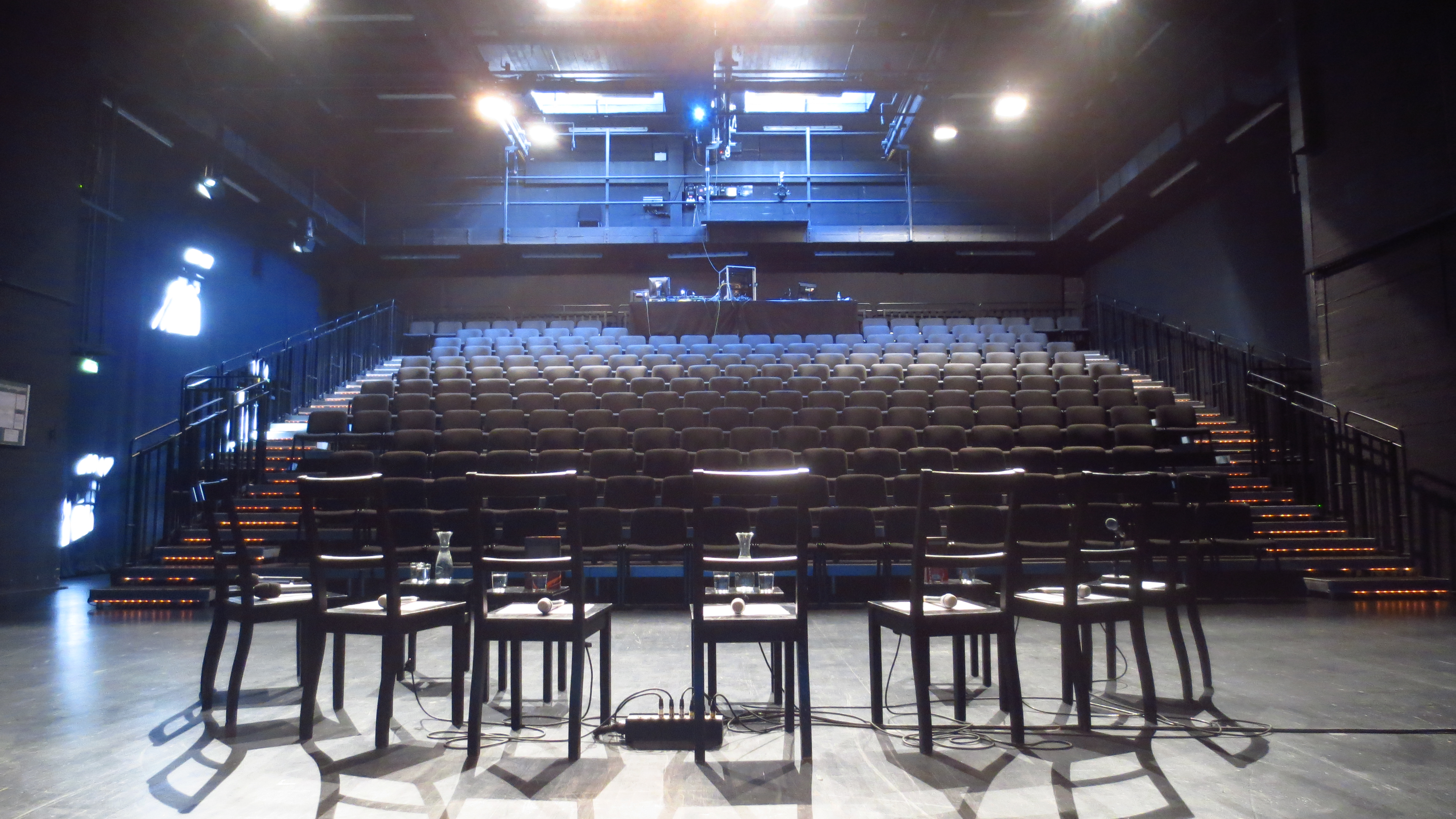
Seitenbühne im Haus der Berliner Festspiele im September 2014

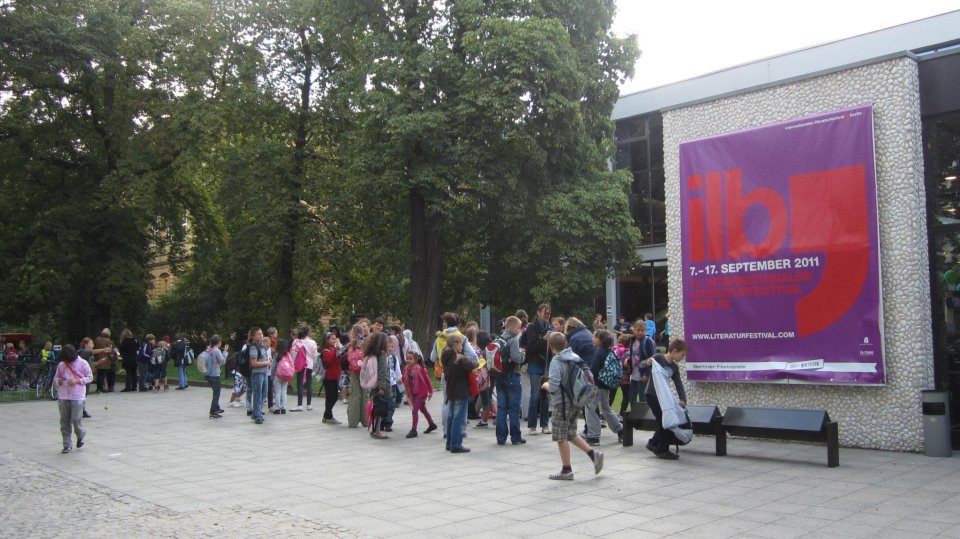
Forecourt of the Haus der Berliner Festspiele in September 2011 during the Berlin International Literature Festival

The Haus der Berliner Festspiele is a theater in Berlin (Schaperstraße 24, 10719 Berlin).

It was opened on 1 May 1963 as the "Theater der Freien Volksbühne". Previously, the West Berlin part of the former Volksbühne Berlin, the Freie Volksbühne Berlin, which was founded in 1948, had used the Theater am Kurfürstendamm as its venue from 1949 to 1963.

Under the direction of Erwin Piscator, the theatre moved into its own new building in 1963. The architect was Fritz Bornemann, who also designed the Deutsche Oper Berlin and the America Memorial Library in Berlin, among others. Rolf Hochhuth's tragedy Der Stellvertreter, which Intendant Piscator had premiered at the Theater am Kurfürstendamm in February 1963, was reopened here on 1 July 1963. Under artistic director Kurt Hübner (1973–1986), directors such as Peter Zadek, Klaus Michael Grüber and Hans Neuenfels offered avant-garde and risk-taking productions without a permanent ensemble. From 1986 to 1990 Neuenfels was artistic director, from 1990 to 1992 Hermann Treusch.

In 1992, the Senate of Berlin withdrew funding from the Theater der Freien Volksbühne, and in 1999 it was sold to an investor. In 2000, the theatre was rented by the federal government and made available to the Berliner Festspiele. In April 2001, it was reopened as the Haus der Berliner Festspiele and played host to events at various festivals throughout the year. The house, with a capacity of well over 1,000 seats (Main Stage: 999, Side Stage: 280, Upper Foyer: 200, Rehearsal Stage: 100, Box Office Hall: 200), has remained almost unchanged to this day and is a listed building. Since its construction, the Berliner Festspiele has regularly used it for the Berliner Theatertreffen and international guest performances. As a festival and event venue, it presents international artists from all fields throughout the year, for example international authors every September as part of the Berlin International Literature Festival.
