= Friedrich-von-Raumer-Bibliothek =

German public library

Friedrich von Raumer Library
- Friedrich-von-Raumer-Bibliothek
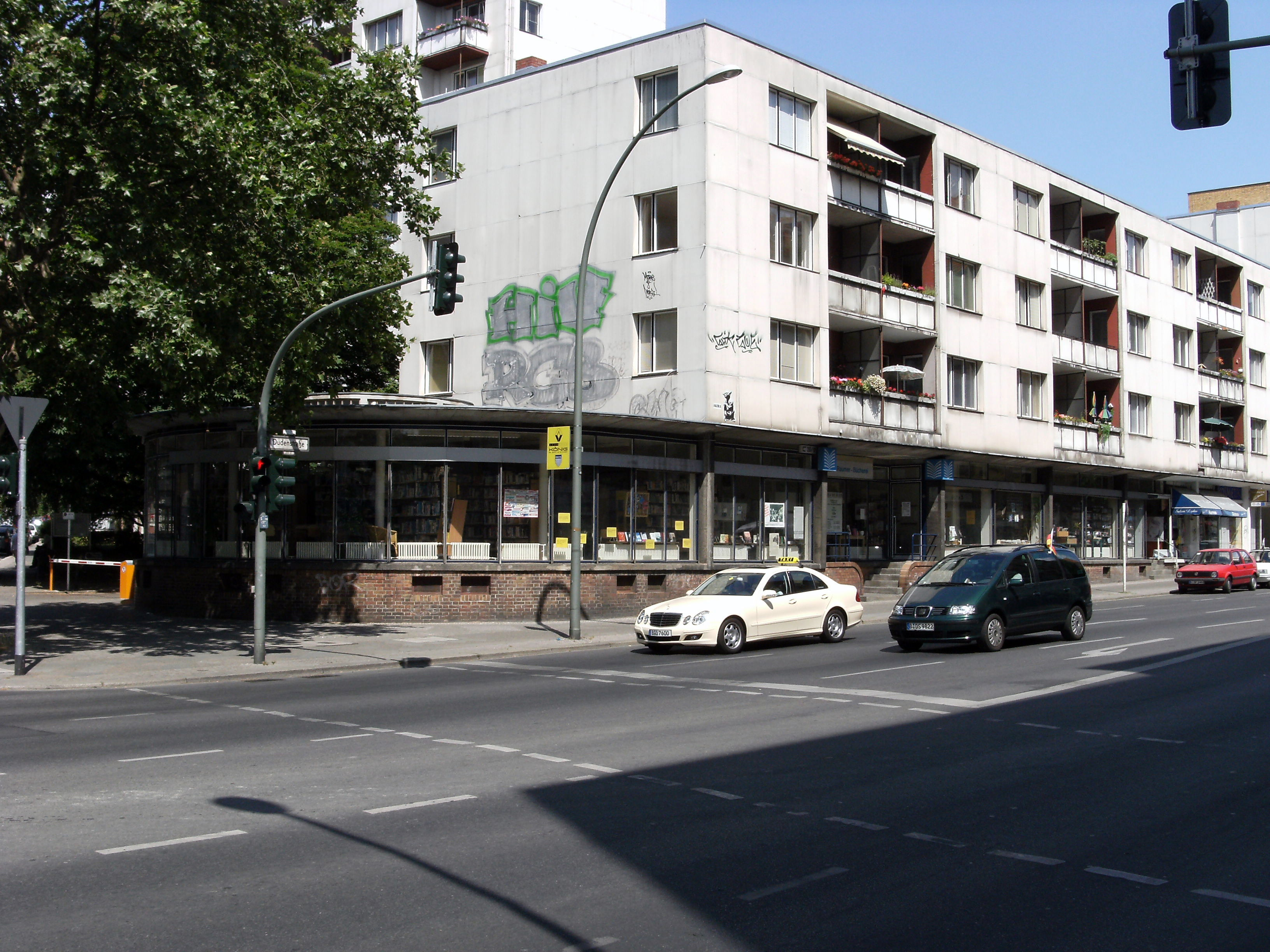
- The Library (on the ground floor), seen from southwest
- 52.485195°N 13.382960°E
- Location: Kreuzberg, Germany
- Type: Neighbourhood library
- Established: 1850

Collection
- Size: 33,360 (2012)
- Legal deposit: No

Access and use
- Circulation: 176,626 (2012)

Other information
- Director: Gudrun Lex
- Website: www.berlin.de/citybibliothek/bibliotheken/dudenstr/

The Friedrich-von-Raumer-Bibliothek (Friedrich von Raumer Library) is a public library in Berlin. It was founded in 1850 and is located in Berlin's Kreuzberg locality on Dudenstraße. After several moves the library found its current location in 1955 in a block of flats of the services trade union Ver.Di by Franz Hoffmann and Max Taut. The library is located in the rotunda, westerly protruding from the block of flats, and in the ground floor of that block. The Raumer Library is a so-called neighbourhood library (Stadtteilbibliothek) within the Stadtbibliothek Friedrichshain-Kreuzberg (city library of the Friedrichshain-Kreuzberg borough), and as such part of the Verbund der Öffentlichen Bibliotheken Berlins (VÖBB), the network of public libraries owned by the city-state.

== Names of the library ==
From its foundation until 1920 the library's official name was Volks⸗Bibliothek No. I at first, since 1870s rather Volksbibliothek I (i.e. people's library No. I). After the Kingdom's transformation into the Free State of Prussia, with many expressions like the term from Greek: βιβλιοθήκη (transcription: bibliothēkē) and Roman numerals being replaced by designations then considered more demotic, the name became 1. Volksbücherei, meaning the same. In 1921 the 4. Volksbücherei was merged with 1. Volksbücherei under the latter name in the former's location. In 1955, on the occasion of moving into a new location, the Library No. I was renamed as Friedrich-von-Raumer-Bücherei in honour of the initial initiator of Berlin's first public libraries, since this library is the successor of two of Berlin's altogether four original public libraries founded in 1850. When in 1995 the more functional name Stadtteilbibliothek Dudenstraße (neighbourhood library on Dudenstraße) was added, the full name got adapted to Friedrich-von-Raumer-Bibliothek.

== History ==
The Raumer Library traces back its origin to two of Berlin's originally four public libraries opened in 1850. The foundation of public libraries in Berlin was promoted by Professor Friedrich von Raumer and others. Returning from his 1841 journey through the United States the professor was deeply impressed by the broad knowledge of average US citizens, whom he had encountered travelling on a Mississippi steam boat. His travel acquaintances ascribed their interest and knowledge to their access to books from public libraries and public lectures on various subjects. Raumer then started an initiative to open public libraries in Berlin too.

By the end of 1841 Raumer and other enthusiasts first founded the Verein für wissenschaftliche Vorträge (i.e. Association for scientific public lectures). The Verein, using the Singing Academy concert hall as its venue for lectures, succeeded to collect Thaler 4,000 (then about £ Sterling 592,59) forming the starting capital for Berlin's to-be-founded public libraries in 1846. Until the end of the 1870s the Verein raised and provided funds amounting to the sixfolds of this initial sum. The Verein, however, wanted the city of Berlin to give a helping hand and take the libraries under its auspices.

Raumer presented his ideas on public libraries, termed as Volksbibliotheken (people's libraries), in a memorandum in 1846, resonating his democratic opinions. As a result, in 1847 Berlin's magistrate (city government) established a standing committee for the establishment and administration of public libraries, consisting of members of the afore-mentioned Verein and of the City Representatives' Assembly (Stadtverordnetenversammlung; then Berlin's city parliament). The Bibliotheks-Kommission (Library Commission) was to appoint the chief librarian, control the library budget and have a say in the book purchases. In December 1848 King Frederick William IV approved the foundation of public libraries, however, his decision remained unpublished due to the repercussions of the March Revolution of that year. The Prussian government added the clause that all works suited to endanger ethical life, religion or the state were strictly to be withheld from the library, while books apt to strengthen traditions, faith and the king's subjects' fidelity were to be preferentially acquired. Starting in 1849 Ernst Fidicin, the city's archivist, served as responsible city official for the Library Commission, and soon determined its acquisitions of books.

With effect of 1 August 1850, the first day at school after the summer holidays, four public libraries opened, numbered I to IV. Each was located in a gymnasium (grammar school) or other highschool of the city and run by its respective director or another appointed teacher. In the city centre, at Friedrichswerdersches Gymnasium (Friedrichswerder Grammar School) on Werderscher Markt, Volks⸗Bibliothek No. I was located, while Volks⸗Bibliothek No. IV was situated in the Louisenstädtische höhere Stadtschule (Luisenstadt Higher City School) on Sebastianstraße 49, both libraries were then in what is Mitte since 1920. The first four libraries opened three times a week for an hour, all residents of Berlin were entitled to use them free of charge. Library users had to procure a certificate of bailment, by which a city or government official or another known citizen of Berlin committed himself to honour the user's eventual open obligations to the library. The certificates of bailment were to renewed every quarter. The starting stock of books, in all four libraries together, was 7,800 pieces. Many books were donated in kind, popular literature was mostly missing.

In 1851 the Library No. I with its primarily scientific scope had 149 registered users, whereas Library No. IV counted 281, the other two libraries made up for the remaining 851 registered users. The Library Commission elected Moritz Fürbringer its president in 1863. In the same year the Library No. IV moved into a new location on Ritterstraße 31, only to move again into Berlin's 47th and 7th municipal school (47. und 7. Gemeindeschule) on Stallschreiberstraße 54a in 1877, both in what became Kreuzberg after 1920. Tradespeople and craftspeople made up for most users, the number of workers among the users rose between 1867 and 1877, but was still below a third in 1877. The number of youth among the users had risen by the time since Berlin's public libraries then had also started to hold media of their interest. In 1878 Fidicin retired.

In the 1880s the development of the libraries stagnated. Budgets for new books were too short, as were the opening hours, librarian consulting was too poor and access too restricted. In 1886 in an article in the Zentralblatt für Bibliothekswesen the Austrian professor Eduard Reyer shed light on the successful work of US American libraries, giving the central European library landscape a new push. Organisations such as the Gesellschaft für die Verbreitung von Volksbildung (Society for spreading knowledge among the people; established in 1871), the Comenius-Gesellschaft (established in 1891), and the Deutsche Gesellschaft für Ethische Kultur (DGEK, German Society for Ethical Culture; established in 1892), confederated in order to promote better organised, more professionally run and better funded libraries, distinguishing themselves from the old-fashioned libraries by terming their institutions public reading or books halls (Lese- or Bücherhalle; the latter term remained namegiving for the charitable endowment holding Hamburg's public libraries). Constantin Nörrenberg, Kiel, and Ernst Jeep, Berlin, became anchormen of the new movement.

Berlin's 1890-appointed chief librarian, the Latvian Germanist and philosopher Arend Buchholtz (1857–1938, titled first Magistrate Librarian, then City Librarian as of 1894), supervising not only the magistrate's official library but all the public libraries of Berlin since 1892, adopted many ideas of the reform movement for the city's public libraries. They demanded that Berlin's libraries should also offer reading rooms. However, Berlin's magistrate rejected Buchholtz' plans and only increased the libraries' budget. Frustrated by this inactivity the DGEK raised funds for a private public library of the American type and on 1 January 1895 it opened the Erste Öffentliche Lesehalle zu Berlin (first public reading hall) on Neue Schönhauser Straße 13, in a rear wing of the Volkskaffee- und Speisehalle. The sensational success of this library, with 21,000 items circulated to the reading room in the first year, forced the magistrate's hand, co-financing the new library and finally granting the funds, which Buchholtz had demanded, in order to open the first reading rooms in Berlin's own public libraries. On 19 October 1896 the Library No. I moved to Mohrenstraße 41.

In 1900 the library No. IV on Stallschreiberstraße 54a counted 5,271 media altogether with 13,291 items put out on loan in that year. On 6 June 1901 the City Representatives' Assembly decided to found a central umbrella library and technical support unit, the Stadtbibliothek Berlin (Berlin City Library; since 1995 succeeded by the Berlin Central and Regional Library), with the libraries No. I and IV also being in its department. Now all books for the local libraries were centrally bought, eventually rebound, centrally catalogued and the catalogues regularly published in print. The staff was centrally employed and paid. The directives of the new central Stadtbibliothek Berlin, housed in the former Market Hall No. III on Zimmerstraße, provided for the standardised manning of all public libraries and, for the first time with Berlin's public libraries, allowed exceptionally women to be appointed as head officials of local public libraries.

The background of this development was that Bona Peiser (1864–1929), full-time head librarian at the Erste Öffentliche Lesehalle and Germany's first woman librarian, had built up a network of women librarians in order to combine and represent their interests, and professionalise their work, forming a very effective trade union of women librarians, named Vereinigung bibliothekarisch arbeitender Frauen as of 1907 (Union of Women working as librarians). Then Peiser had become the head librarian and director of the library of the Kaufmännischer Verband für weibliche Angestellte (Mercantile Federation for female Employees, another trade union), and she made both libraries under her auspices the first institutions for the professional education of women as librarians in Germany. So a number of well educated professional women were ready to work as full-time librarians.

During the First World War the libraries No. I and IV, like all public libraries in Berlin, suffered from budget cutbacks, shortage of heating fuel and the like more. In the wearisome later war years users, stressed by the tense food situation, came less often than in the prior years. In 1921 the Library No. I with its bookstock moved into the premise of the Library No. IV on Stallschreiberstraße 54a (since 1877), which had been shut down due to the war. The Library No. I took on installations and inventory of the Library No. IV. In 1926 the Library No. I moved within the school compound into larger rooms equipped with all new library technology of the time, such as a card catalogue on a turning table, movable shelves, book charts etc. An extra children reading room, named 4. Kinderlesehalle, was part of the extended premise. As to the users of her library in 1926 the director of the Library No. I noted that tradespeople and craftspeople formed the bulk of them.

In the same year the tasks of the Stadtbibliothek Berlin as the central unit for the public libraries on the territory of pre-1920 Berlin ended, however, it continued as Berlin's largest public library. Its affiliate libraries were reorganised into six units delineated along the boundaries of the six new boroughs covering Berlin's pre-1920 municipal territory. Thus the Library No. I, along with No. V (specialised on children), IX, XIV, XXII and XXIV, became part the umbrella unit Stadtbücherei Kreuzberg (Kreuzberg city library), directed by Curt Wormann (he; 1900–1991), who had started working with the network of public libraries under the Stadtbibliothek Berlin in 1923. In 1928 the Kreuzberg Head Library, also domicile to Wormann's office, moved into a provisional location on Belle-Alliance-Straße 80 (renamed and renumbered as Mehringdamm 59), the planned new head library building only materialised in 1964 (Wilhelm-Liebknecht-Bibliothek).

During the Great Depression since 1929 the circulation rose by almost 50%, the number of users by 30%. Right after the Nazis' takeover of power their newspapers started an inflammatory propaganda against – what they called – subversive literature among the public libraries holdings. On 6 April 1933 leading members of the German Student Union had announced book burnings, conducted in many German university cities on 10 May. Following the Law for the Restoration of the Professional Civil Service of 7 April the Library No. I lost Else Simon, who was fired for being Jewish, as was Wormann, director of all the Kreuzberg public libraries. Simon later was murdered in Auschwitz. The directorate remained vacant, so that the collaboration between the Kreuzberg public libraries loosened. Only in 1948 the position of a head of all Kreuzberg public libraries was restaffed, however, provisionally only.

On 26 April 1933 Berlin's Library Councillor Dr. Max Wieser and the librarian Dr. Hans Engelhard issued a black list of undesired books. Public librarians were told to withhold "undesired" books from loaning, however, some librarians ignored this in cases of acquainted users whom they trusted. Between 1 July and 15 August 1933 the Library No. I, like all of Berlin's public libraries, remained shut in order to separate out all "undesired" media. The concerned books were then stored away in the stacks in the Neuer Marstall, since 1921 part of the premise of the Stadtbibliothek Berlin collections. As part of the Nazi employment policy the number of librarians in Kreuzberg's public libraries rose from 14 to 31, as generally with all the government workforce and bureaucracy.

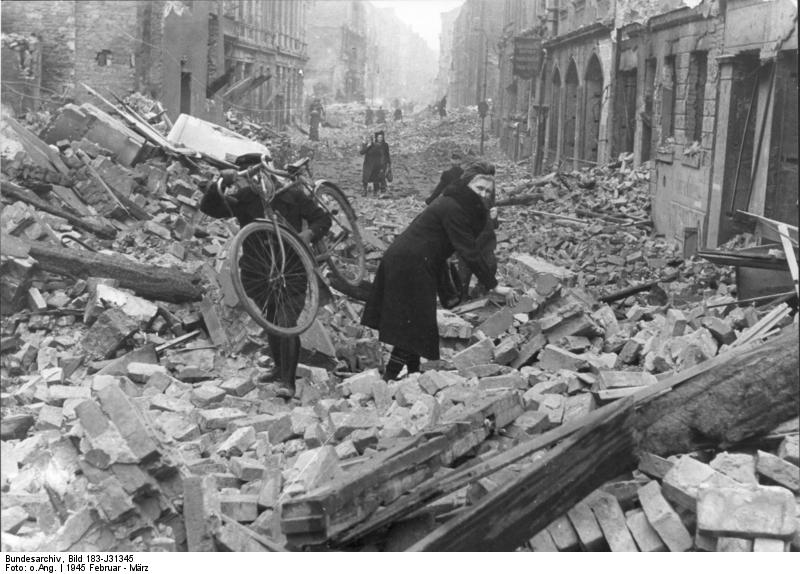
Stallschreiberstraße in ruins after the US air raid of 3 February 1945

After beginning of the Second World War the Library No. I had to close its children's reading room, 4. Kinderlesehalle, since its premise was taken over by an air raid precautions unit (ARP), a decontamination squad. In the wearisome later war years, as of 1942, adult users were so busy with the ever extended weekly working time that people up to the age of 18 made up 57% of all users. Also the staff was reduced again from 31 to 12 by recruiting men for war and women for obligatory other labour.

On 3 February 1945 the 47th and 7th school and the Library No. I were both heavily damaged in the US air raid on that fore-noon, most of the Luisenstadt neighbourhood had been bombed to ashes. The school, like many public buildings hosting ARP units, was saved from burning out completely, so that the Library No. I could at least rescue much of its holdings and other equipment. It moved into another location on Tempelhofer Ufer 15, in the Tempelhofer Vorstadt neighbourhood.

In summer 1945 the once forbidden books stored away since March 1933 in the premises of the Stadtbibliothek Berlin were handed over again to those 43 public libraries, out of a 106 as of 1939, which were at all able to resume operation. In September 1945 Georgy Zhukov ordered that all state-owned and private public libraries in Berlin have to hand in all literature of Nazi and militarist content. In March 1946 the recorded bookstock had halved and the staff reduced to a third as compared with 1939.

In June 1946 the Allied Kommandatura confirmed Zhukov's order of September 1945. Otto Winzer, then head of the public education department in the Soviet-appointed new magistrate for all four Allied sectors of Berlin, ordered on 6 June 1946 all libraries to be closed in order to separate out all books of Nazi weltanschauung, of revanchist and monarchy-glorifying opinion. Winzer's department set up a specified black list of titles to be separated out. However, in the Library No. I, like all over the western sectors this black list circulated by the magistrate was not followed since it was considered as subsuming too many titles of other leaning as National Socialistic or militarist.

All the remaining librarian staff was assessed as to their political leaning during the Nazi dictatorship. The head of the Library No. I, already in charge before the Nazi period, was assessed as being a bourgeois democrat, as were her fellow head colleagues in Kreuzberg. Thereafter the Library No. I reopened. New librarians were educated, working on three week days, and learning another three days in the new librarian school of Berlin.

The replenishment of the bookstock, centrally directed by the department of public education then under communist auspices within the undivided magistrate, brought many Soviet glorifying and communist literature into the libraries. So after separating the city administrations into one for the eastern sector and another for the three western sectors in November and December 1948 the Library No. I, like all public libraries in West Berlin, came under the newly built up library department in West Berlin. The new western department urged another separating out of books, this time those considered being communist propaganda. The political division of Berlin caused many librarians working in East Berlin, often experienced and qualified, quitting their jobs and applying at libraries in the western sectors. This migration ended only in 1961, when the Berlin Wall inhibited it. As compared with librarians in the West of Germany this background of many librarians in West Berlin and the general experience of West Berliners with the communist rule in the East partially explains the reluctance with which books of communist authors, of socialist leaning (not to be confused with social democratic) East bloc provenance were acknowledged in the purchasing conferences held by the librarians.

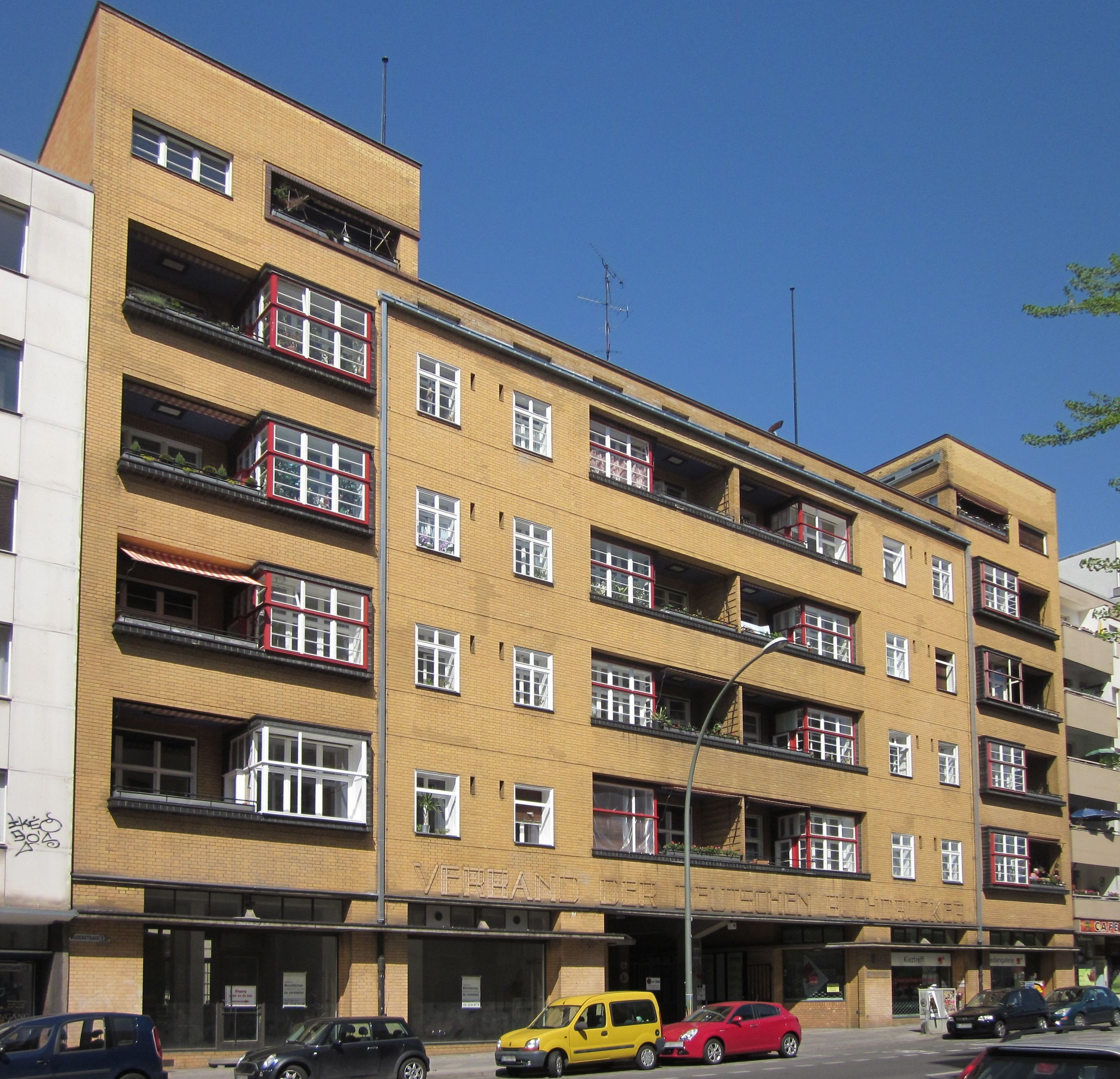
Verband der Deutschen Buchdrucker building, Dudenstraße 10.

In August 1951 the Library No. I moved into a location in the Verbandshaus der Deutschen Buchdrucker on Dudenstraße 10, with the reading room only opened some months later. The bookstock had recovered in numbers, but it was widely antiquated, since due to lack of funds, many book donations of poor shape, quality and currentness had been integrated into the collection.

In 1953 Alfred Kalisch (*1925) became head of the Library No. I. After in 1954 the new central public library for West Berlin, the America Memorial Library (Amerika-Gedenkbibliothek, AGB), financed through the McCloy Grant in memory of enduring the Berlin Blockade by the West Berliners and the western Allied forces involved, had opened its doors it attracted many Kreuzbergers who prior used to frequent one of the four smaller public libraries in the then borough of Kreuzberg.

Part of the attractiveness of the AGB derived from it being an American-type open access library, whereas most of Berlin's other libraries held by then only small shares of their bookstock in open access, usually only the non-lending collection. So opening the AGB, again gave the Berlin libraries another push forwards in their development. On 31 March 1955, after years of campaigning, Alexander Dehms (1904–1979; head of Kreuzberg's public libraries from 1949 to 1969 and member of the House of Representatives of Berlin), succeeded in putting the Berliner Büchereigesetz (Berlin Library Act) through which provided for an expansion, better funding and improved equipment of West Berlin's public libraries through budgetary items earmarked for libraries.

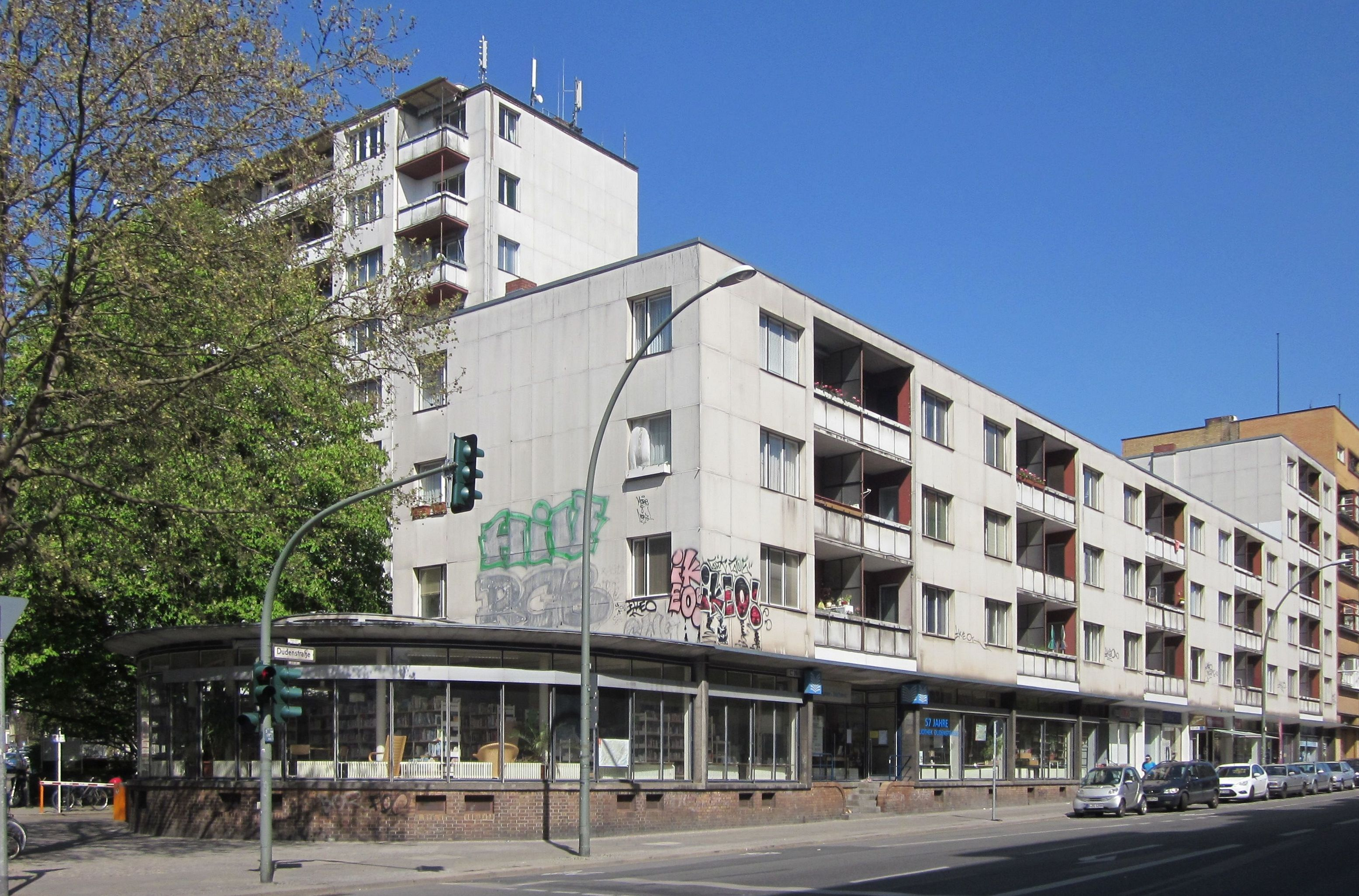
Building Dudenstraße 12–20, seen from southwest

This new act also enabled constructing new library buildings in West Berlin, so that also the Library No. I could move into a newly built location, built from 1954 and 1955 and addressed as Dudenstraße 12–20 and Methfesselstraße 45–49. The library moved from Dudenstraße No. 10 to the neighbouring building with the entrance at No. 18–20. Hoffmann and Taut, who were the architects of the prior location as well as of the new one, had designed a modern building with bright rooms. So the Library No. I profited from the new act, which in the early 1960s was already de facto suspended by the House of Representatives when the earmarking of funds for libraries was skipped. After the library development plan, fixed under the Library Act, had expired in 1965, the public funding never recovered.

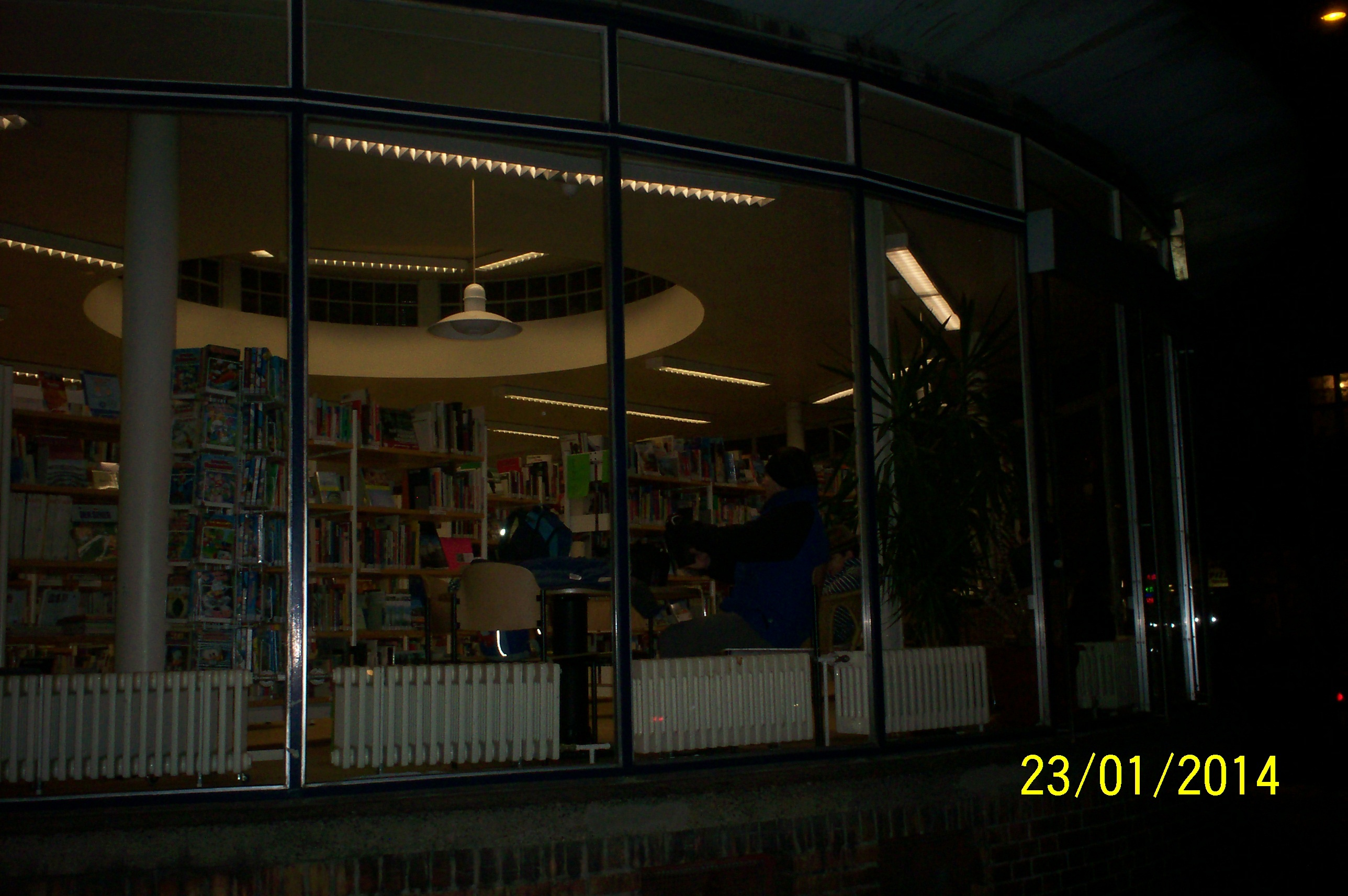
View from outside into the children's department in the illuminated rotunda with its tholobate.

On the occasion of its reopening the Library No. I was renamed as Friedrich von Raumer Library. The new premise was designed as an open access library right from the beginning. Also Kreuzberg's central public bookbindery moved from Zossener Straße into the new building. The reading room was closed and converted into an open access library of juvenile literature in 1957. In the same year the bookbindery moved into the Kreuzberg borough hall on Yorckstraße 4–11. In 1969 Kalisch succeeded Dehms as head of Kreuzberg's public libraries.

In 1971 the Raumer Library received a subject heading catalogue. Following the 1968 movement labour and the forms of collaboration among the librarians became less hierarchic, more collegial and broader as to the number of personnel included in decision taking. The informal new panels seized also tasks of other boards, so that in 1977 purchase conference ceased to meet, and all librarians are involved in the decision taking. These new forms of collaboration entailed a high identification of librarians with their work and library.

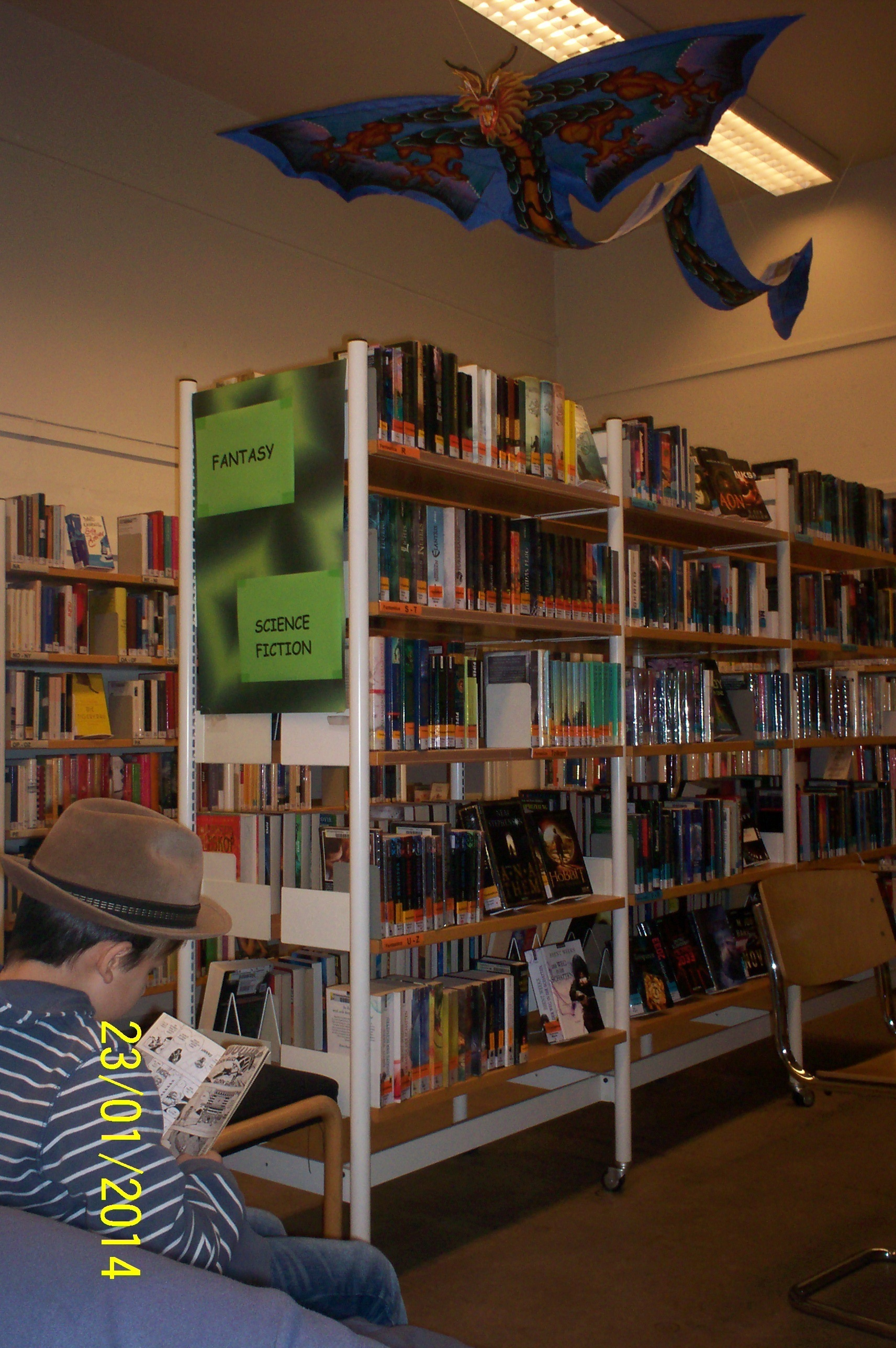
Room in the ground floor of that part of the building addressed as Dudenstrasse #18

In 1987 the library was closed for some time due to a thorough overhaul. In 1988 the Raumer Library started lending CDs. In 1996 the SPD faction in the Kreuzberg borough assembly moved for assessing the possibility and the consequencies of closing the Raumer Library and the Bona Peiser Library. In signature campaigns more than 5,000 people came out in favour of maintaining the concerned libraries. The libraries remained, however, the Kreuzberg budget for book and media purchases was cut back from DM 400,000 to 210,000 in 1997. In late 2000 the Raumer Library became a part of the VÖBB.

== Today ==
Today the Raumer Library is the biggest of the branch libraries in Friedrichshain-Kreuzberg. The library is active in reading education of children, and offers courses for adults for reading from books. Occasionally the Raumer Library hosts art exhibitions, such as works of the Bildhauerwerkstatt (sculptors' workshop) of the Hector-Peterson-Schule (in 2002) or paintings by Luise Grimm (in 1965 and 1970). The Raumer Library celebrated its 55th anniversary in the current location in 2010 with a little exhibition of photos from the opening in the current building in 1955. Between 27 January to 7 February 2012 the library was closed in order to install devices automatising the circulation procedures.

== Media stock ==
Media stock:

- 1900: 5,271 (this number for then Library No. IV)
- 1989: 49,000 (approx.)
- 1991: 50,207
- 1997: 44,346
- 2002: 47,000 (approx.)
- 2012: 33,360
