= Reyer =

Reyer is a surname. Notable people with the surname include:

- Cordula Reyer (born 1964), Austrian model
- Eduard Reyer (1849–1914), Austrian geologist
- Ernest Reyer
- Sophie Anna Reyer (born 1984), Austrian author
- Walther Reyer (1922–1999), Austrian actor
