= Melchior Goldast =

Swiss jurist (1578–1635)

Melchior Goldast von Haiminsfeld (Goldastus) (6 January 1576 or 1578, Switzerland – Gießen, Germany, 1635) was a Swiss jurist and an industrious though uncritical collector of documents relating to the medieval history and constitution of Germany. He was a Calvinist writer of note.

== Life ==
He was born to poor Protestant parents near Bischofszell, in the Swiss canton of Thurgau. His university career, first at Ingolstadt (1595–1596) and then at Altdorf bei Nürnberg (1597–1598), was cut short by his poverty, from which he suffered all his life and which was the main cause of his wanderings. In 1598, he found a rich protector in Bartholomaeus Schobinger of St. Gall, who enabled him to study at St. Gall (where he first became interested in medieval documents, which abound in the Abbey of St. Gall) and elsewhere in Switzerland. The year before his patron's death in 1604, he became secretary to Henri, duc de Bouillon, with whom he went to Heidelberg and Frankfurt. In 1604, he entered the service of the Baron von Hohensax, the possessor of the Codex Manesse, the precious manuscript volume of old German Minnesänger of which Goldast published excerpts.

Soon he was back in Switzerland, and by 1606 in Frankfurt, earning his living by preparing and correcting books for the press. In 1611, he was appointed councillor at the court of Saxe-Weimar, and in 1615 he entered the service of Graf Ernst von Schaumburg at Buckeburg. In 1624, he was forced by developments in the Thirty Years War to retire to Bremen; there in 1625, he deposited his library in that of the town, (Note: His books were bought by the town in 1646, but many of his manuscripts passed to Queen Christina of Sweden, and hence are now in the Vatican Library.) he himself returning to Frankfurt. In 1627, he became councillor to Emperor Ferdinand II and to the archbishop-elector of Trier, and in 1633 passed to the service of the landgrave of Hesse-Darmstadt. He died at Gießen early in 1635.

== Publications ==
His immense industry is shown by the fact that his biographer, Heinrich Christian Senckenberg, gives a list of 65 works published or written by him, some extending to several substantial volumes. Among the more important are his Paraeneticorum veterum pars i. (1604), which contained the old German tales of Kunig Tyrol von Schotten, the Winsbeke and the Winsbekin; Suevicarum rerum scriptores (Frankfurt, 1605, new edition, 1727); Rerum Alamannicarum scriptores (Frankfurt, 1606, new edition by Senckenburg, 1730); Constitutiones imperiales (Frankfurt, 1607–1613, 4 vols.); Monarchia sacri Romani imperii (Hanover and Frankfurt, 1612–1614, 3 vols.); and Commentarii de regni Bohemiae juribus (Frankfurt, 1627, new edition by Schmink, 1719). He also edited Jacques Auguste de Thou's Historia sui temporis (1609–1610) and the works of Willibald Pirckheimer (1610).

In 1688, a volume of letters addressed to him by his learned friends was published.

He is generally considered to be the forger of the Soranian Letters, supposedly the correspondence between Antony, Cleopatra, and the physician Soranus.

== Bibliography ==
- Dunphy, Graeme (2008). "Melchior Goldast und Martin Opitz. Humanistische Mittelalter-Rezeption um 1600". In McLelland, Nicola; Schiewer, Hans-Jochen; Schmitt, Stefanie (eds.). Humanismus in der deutschen Literatur des Mittelalters und der Frühen Neuzeit. Tübingen: Max Niemeyer. pp. 105–121. ISBN 3484640308.
- Andrew, J. N., History of the Sabbath and First Day of the Week (2nd ed.), Battle Creek, Michigan: Steam Press of the Seventh-Day Adventist Publishing Assn., 1873.
- This work in turn cites:
  - Heinrich Christian Senckenberg, Life prefixed to his 1730 edition of Goldast's Works.
  - R. von Raumer, Geschichte der germanischen Philologie (Munich, 1870).
