= Gedenkbibliothek =

Gedenkbibliothek (English: Memorial Library) may refer to:

- Amerika-Gedenkbibliothek (American Memorial Library)
- Gedenkbibliothek zu Ehren der Opfer des Kommunismus (Memorial Library in honour of the victims of Communism)

== See also ==
- Presidential library
