= Karen Van Lengen =

American architect

- Born: 1951 (age 74–75); Syracuse, New York
- Occupations: Architect, researcher, professor

Academic work
- Discipline: Architecture

Karen Van Lengen (born 1951) is an American architect, educator, and artist. She has designed residential and institutional projects, founding the office Karen Van Lengen Architects in 1986. Van Lengen is also known for her work on the sonic atmospheres of space and extensive academic leadership, serving as the Dean of the University of Virginia School of Architecture from 1999 to 2009. Her books include Soundscape Architecture (2025), Urgent Matters: Designing the School of Architecture at Jefferson's University (2009), Vassar College: The Campus Guide (co-author, 2004), and Cityscapes (1999).

== Early life ==
Born in Syracuse, New York, in 1951, the second of five children of Robert Warner Van Lengen, a lawyer, and Carol Freiberger Van Lengen, a self-taught architect and family counselor. She grew up in a house designed and built by her mother, which she documented almost 50 years later.

Van Lengen graduated from Vassar College in 1973 with honors in Psychology while developing an interest in architecture. She earned her MArch degree from Columbia University 1976.

== Architectural practice ==
Model of design of entrance view of the American Memorial Library addition in Berlin by Karen Van Lengen, 1990 (unrealized build)

She began her architectural career at the office of I.M. Pei & Partners, where she became one of the first female design associates in the firm. She left the firm to become a Fulbright Fellow in Rome and began teaching in the University of Notre Dame School of Architecture, Rome Studies Program.

In 1986, she founded her own office, Karen Van Lengen Architects, based in New York City, completing many residential and institutional projects, and entering and exhibiting in multiple architectural competitions.

Van Lengen won the 1988–1989 international, invitational competition as architect for an addition to the Amerika-Gedenkbibliothek (America Memorial Library) in Berlin, Germany. She worked with the office of Inken Baller in Berlin to develop the project over the next two years. They completed approximately 75% of the drawings, before the project was cancelled in 1992 by the City of Berlin due to funding issues resulting from economic shifts after German reunification and the fall of the Berlin Wall.

== Academic work ==
Photo of a digital painting of the sounds of the New York Public Library Reading Room. 2020. Art by Karen Van Lengen and Jim Welty.

Parallel to architectural practice, Van Lengen developed an academic career beginning with the appointment Chair of Architecture at Parsons School of Design, The New School from 1995 to 1999, where she founded the Design Workshop Studio that sponsors a theory to practice studio in which students collaboratively design and then build a project in the public realm.

In 1999, she was named the first female Dean of the University of Virginia School of Architecture, (1999–2009). Working with the University's Institute for Practical Ethics, Van Lengen introduced the concept of the relation of ethics and aesthetics that became a central discussion in the interdisciplinary work of the school. With Ariel Gomez (Vice President for Research) they initiated the first pan University programs to develop cross disciplinary work on environmental strategies for the future. She also founded Women’s Work, a monthly lecture series by women from all schools at the University to share and promote their research.

Known for her program “Campbell Constructions”, in which she deployed faculty and alumni to renovate and add to their existing building, Campbell Hall. During this 10-year period they completed 12 projects from the scale of a table to the scale of a building and its contiguous landscape.

Following her Deanship, as the Kenan Professor of Architecture, she developed an interest in the sonics of spaces with her artist collaborator, Jim Welty. In a Fellowship of the Institute for Advanced Technology in the Humanities at the University of Virginia, they built their first interactive web site of the soundscapes of buildings around the world. After several exhibitions of the work they authored, Soundscape Architecture (2025) that includes essays as well as a description of this multi-year process of recording spaces, creating interpretive sound drawings, animating these drawings and making digital paintings from these listening experiences. Van Lengen retired as Emeritus Dean and Emeritus Kenan Professor of Architecture in 2025.

== Awards ==
- Distinguished Achievement Award, American Institute of Architects, VA, 2009
- Elizabeth Zintl Leadership Award, Maxine Platzer Lynn Women's Center, UVA, 2010
- Fellow, Institute for Advanced Technology in the Humanities, University of Virginia, 2012-14
- Van Lengen Lobby, Campbell Hall, University of Virginia School of Architecture, 2025

== Sonic exhibitions ==
- “Listening Theatres: The Sounds of Iconic Landscapes and Architectural Spaces”, Branch Museum of Architecture and Design, Branch House, Richmond, VA, 2020
- ”New York Public Library Animation” in, “The Senses: Design Beyond Vision” exhibition, Cooper Hewitt, Smithsonian Design Museum, 2018 https://www.cooperhewitt.org/channel/senses
- “Soundscape New York”, installation at the Museum of the City of New York, 2015 https://www.mcny.org/exhibition/soundscape-new-york
- "MIX House", (animation with Joel Sanders and Ben Rubin). Permanent collection of Art Institute of Chicago, 2010 https://www.artic.edu/artworks/204295/mix-house

== Selected bibliography ==
=== Books ===
- Van Lengen, K. (2025). Soundscape Architecture. Oro Editions.
- Van Lengen, K. (2009). Urgent Matters: Designing the School of Architecture at Jefferson's University. University of Virginia School of Architecture.
- Van Lengen, K. & Reilly, L. (2004). Vassar College: The Campus Guide. Princeton Architectural Press.
- Van Lengen. (2000). Cityscapes. Parsons School of Design.

=== Selected articles ===
- Van Lengen, K. Lacrimae Rerum and Tears of Memory: Sonic Encounters in the Public Realm. In, Sioli, A., & Kiourtsoglou, E. (2025). The Sound of Architecture: Acoustic Atmospheres in Place. Leuven University Press. https://doi.org/10.2307/j.ctv26dhjbs.17
- Van Lengen, K. Chapter 5, “Architecture.” [71-88] In, Worthington, D. L., & Bodie, G. D. (Eds.). (2020). The Handbook of Listening. John Wiley & Sons.
- Lengen, K. V. (2019). Pedagogy and place: The legacy of the landscape at Vassar College. [147-176] In, Beardsley, J. & Bluestone, D. [Eds.]. Landscape and the Academy. Dumbarton Oaks.
- Van Lengen, K. (1996). “The Busy Woman’s Dream Home”. In Ladies Home Journal, February, 126–130.
