= Berliner Festspiele =

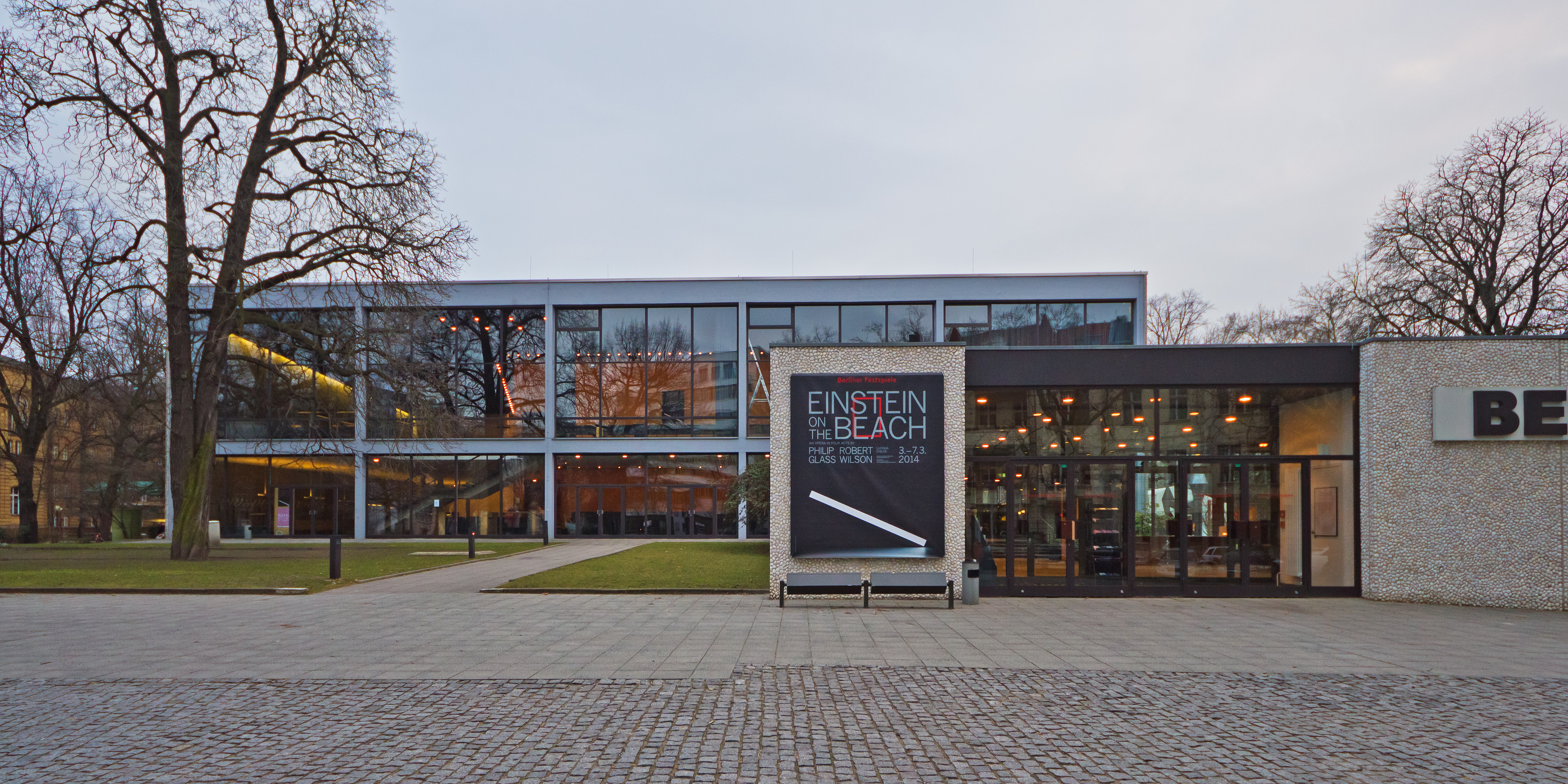
Haus der Berliner Festspiele (2014)

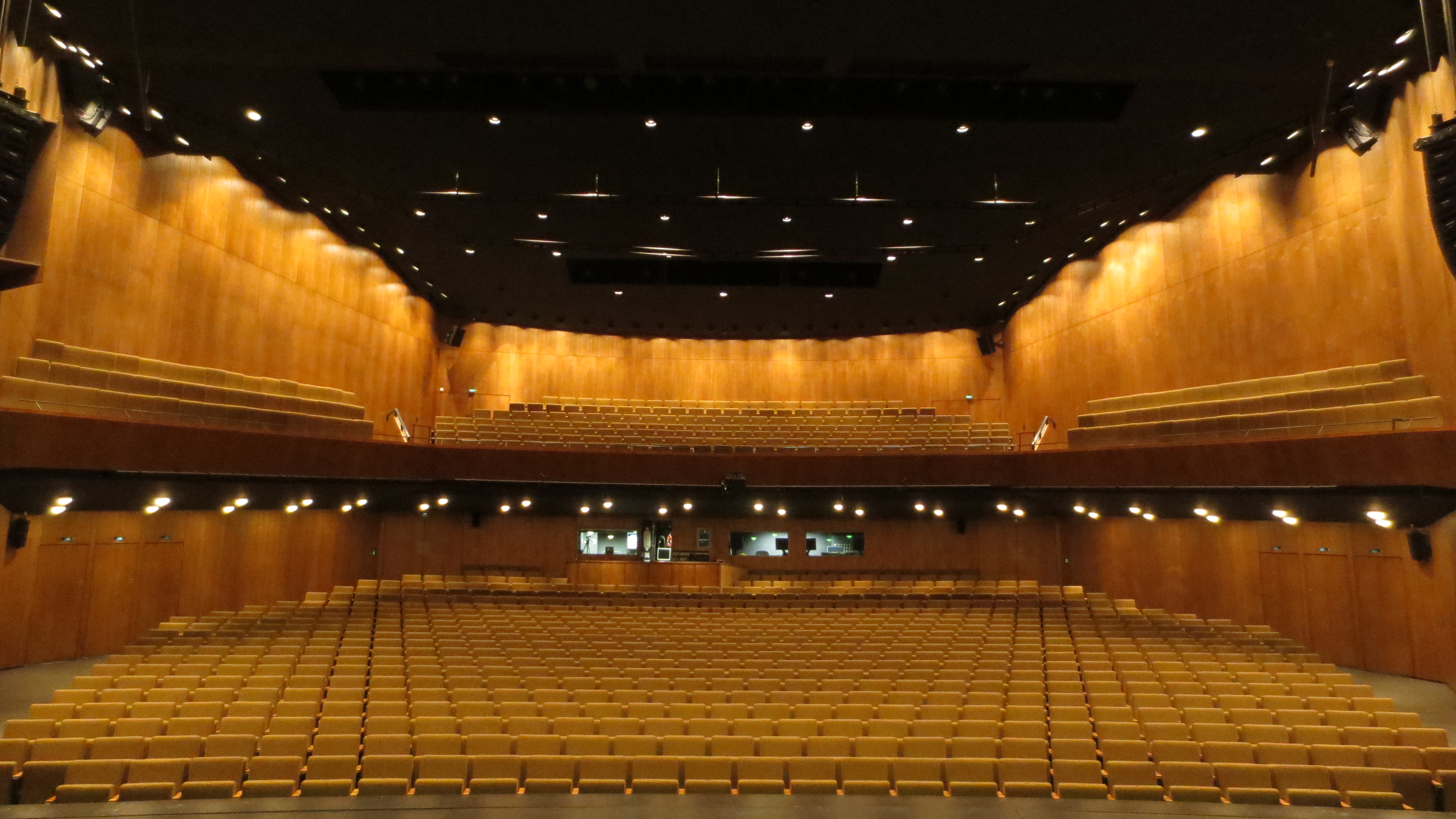
Main stage at Haus der Berliner Festspiele (September 2013)

The Berliner Festspiele (German for Berlin Festivals) in Berlin organise and stage a large number of independent festivals as well as exhibitions and individual events in the fields of music, theatre, performance, dance, literature and visual arts throughout the year. Events are held at the Haus der Berliner Festspiele, a pre-existing theatre devolved to that purpose in 2001, as well as at the Martin-Gropius-Bau and other venues.

The first of these events were the Berliner Festwochen (classical music) and the Berlin International Film Festival, in 1951. They contributed to the cultural life of West Berlin in divided Germany, before being expanded into the Eastern part of the city following Reunification.

Festivals of the Berliner Festspiele include:

- MaerzMusik – Festival of Contemporary Issues, in March.
- Theatertreffen Berlin, in May.
- Musikfest Berlin, in September.
- JazzFest Berlin, in early November.
- Immersion, all year long.
- Treffen junge Szene (Competition for young artists):
  - Theatertreffen der Jugend, in late May and early June.
  - Tanztreffen der Jugend, in late September.
  - Treffen junger Autor*innen, in mid-November.
  - Treffen Junge Musikszene, in late November.
