= Max Taut =

German architect

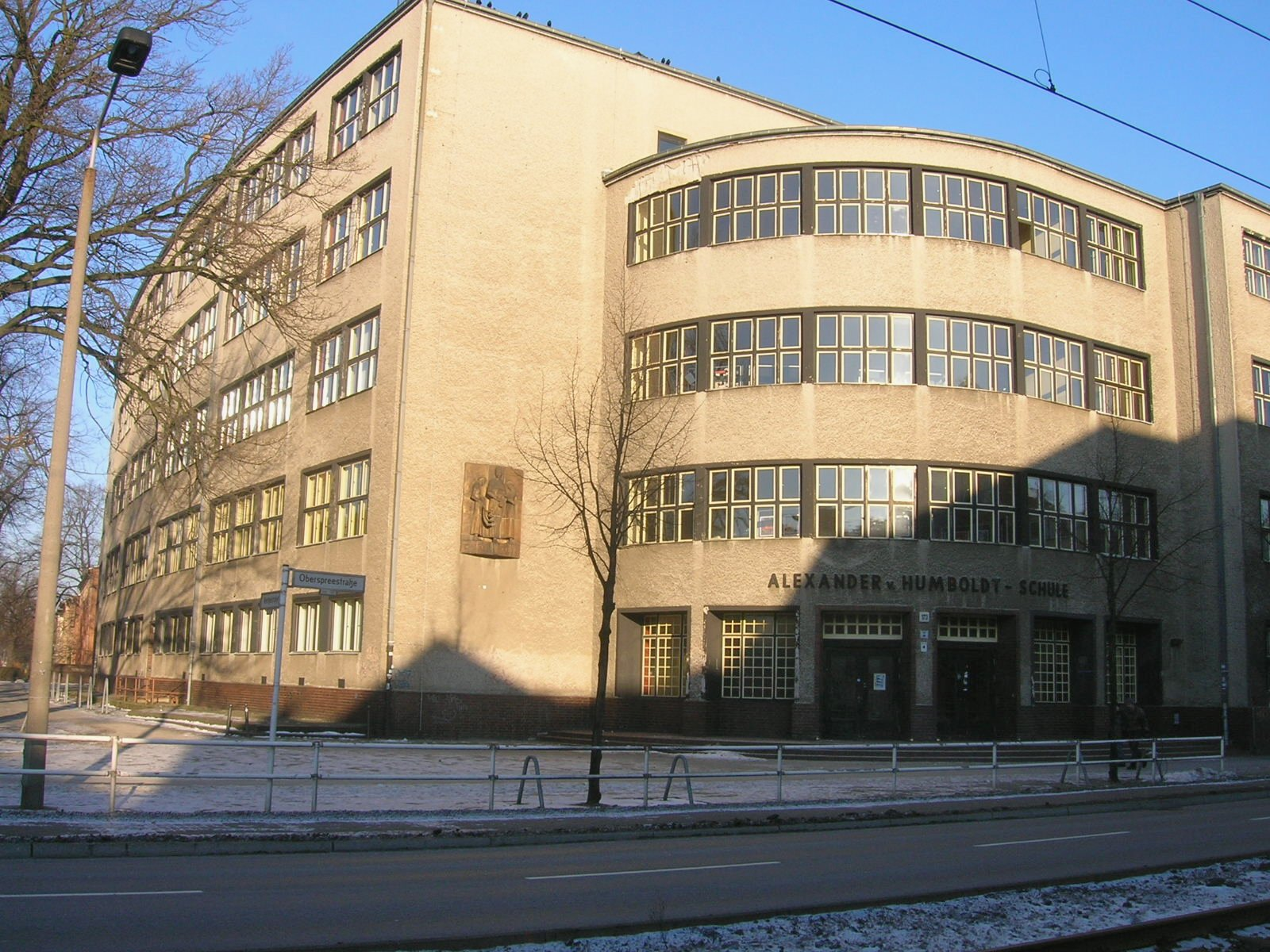
Berlin AvH-Oberschule

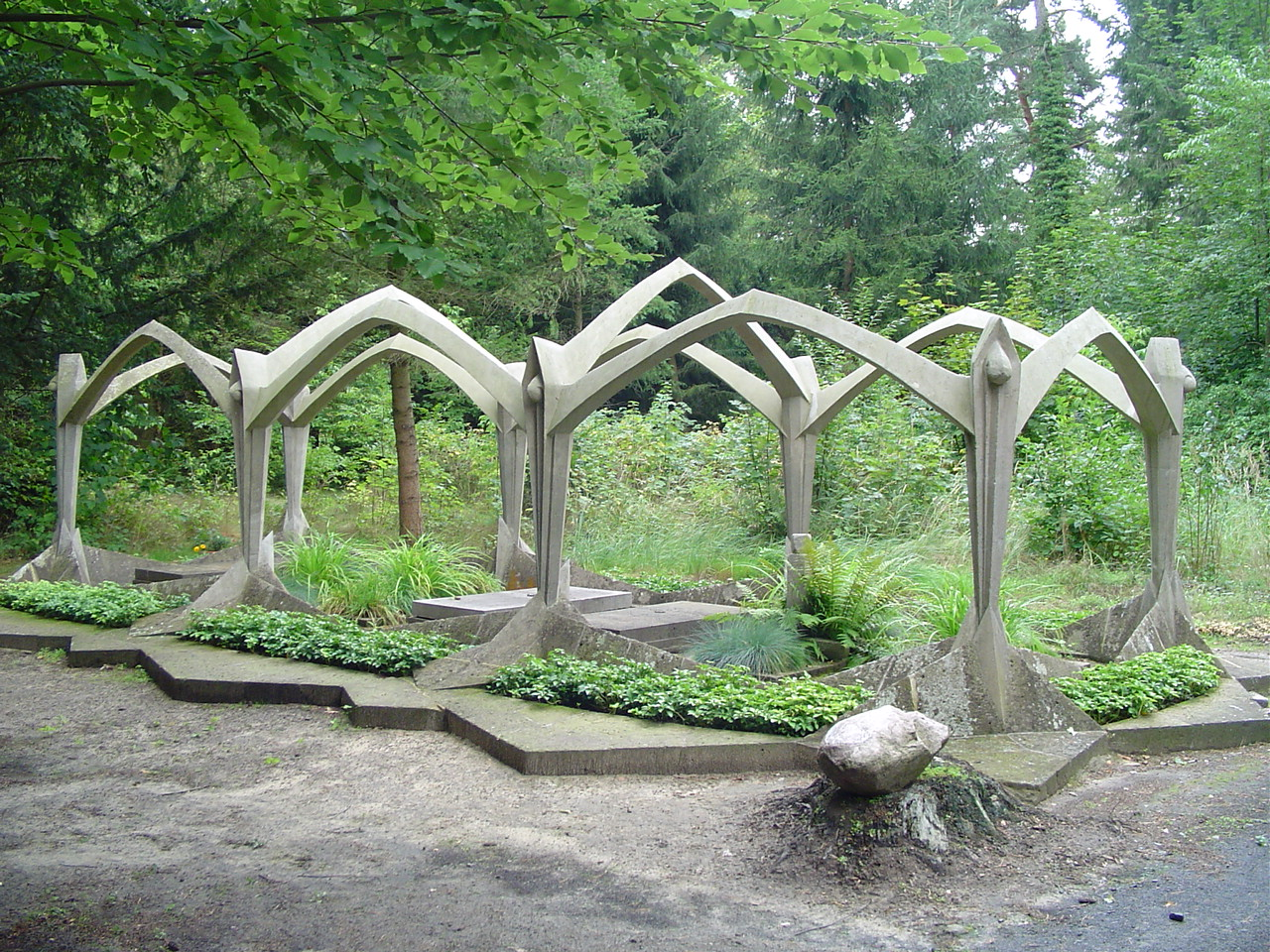
Expressionist grave in Stahnsdorf graveyard, 1920

Max Taut (15 May 1884 – 26 February 1967) was a German architect.

== Biography ==
Max Taut was born in Königsberg, the younger brother of Bruno Taut. He, his brother and Franz Hoffman formed Taut & Hoffman, an architecture firm in Berlin, In the 1920s, Max Taut was particularly known for his office buildings for trade unions. Between 1922 and 1925, he built one house a year on Hiddensee island, each one very different from the others.

The Deutscher Buchdrucker building (1924–1926) on Dudenstraße in Berlin and the consumer cooperatives' department store (1930–1933) on Oranienplatz are two of his most important buildings and are on the Berlin list of heritage sites.

He was a member of the Glass Chain and the Novembergruppe. He was also a member of the avant garde architectural society, Zehnerring, which included Mies van der Rohe, Walter Gropius and Erich Mendelsohn. His primary importance exists in the development of framed buildings, which showed the construction of the building and symbolized a new, democratic openness in architecture.

After the Second World War, he and Wilhelm Büning founded a new architecture school at the Berlin University of the Arts. His postwar work includes the Reutersiedlung (1948–1952) in Bonn and Ludwig Georgs Gymnasium (1951–1955) in Darmstadt.

Taut was buried at the Choriner monastery cemetery.

== Works ==
=== Buildings ===
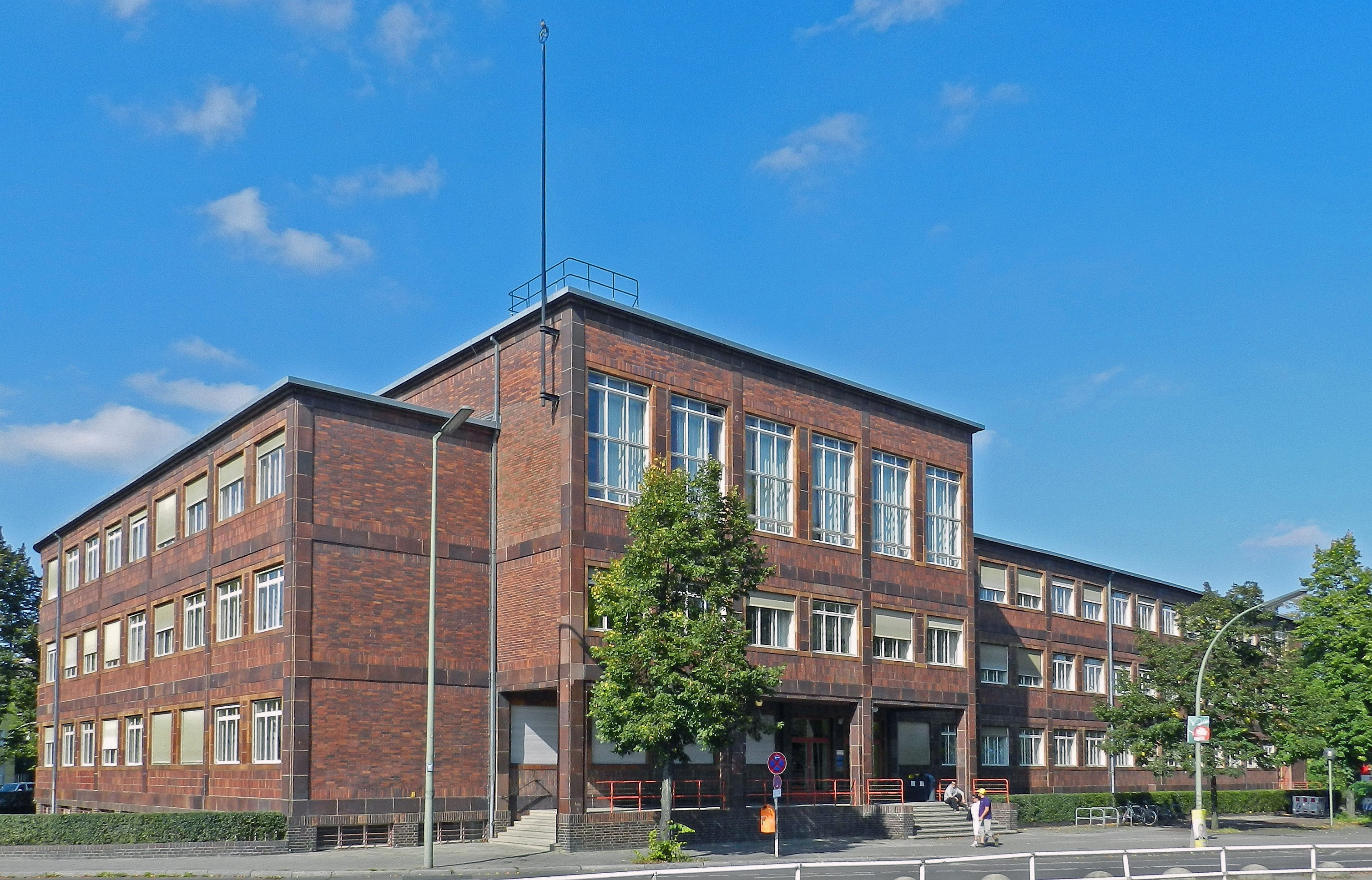
Reichsknappschaftshaus in Berlin

- Janusz Korczak Gymnasium, formerly the Knabenschule in Finsterwalde (1913)
- Administration building, Allgemeiner Deutscher Gewerkschaftsbund in Berlin-Mitte (1922–1923)
- Two houses in the Weißenhofsiedlung in Stuttgart (1927)
- Verband der Deutschen Buchdrucker building on Dudenstraße 10, Berlin (1924–1926), designed with Franz Hoffmann.
- Alexander von Humboldt Oberschule in Berlin-Köpenick, formerly Oberlyzeum "Dorotheenschule" (1929)
- Trade union building, Frankfurt am Main (1929–1931)
- Nöldnerplatz group of schools in Berlin-Lichtenberg (1927–1932)
- Reichsknappschafthaus on Breitenbachplatz in Berlin (1930), designed with Franz Hoffmann. Designed in the Bauhaus style with a steel frame and a ceramic-tile facade. (Used today by the Institute for Latin American Studies, Free University of Berlin).
- Block of flats with library on Dudenstraße 12–20, Berlin (1954–1955), designed with Franz Hoffmann.
- 1963/64 Renovation of the Jagdschloss Glienicke, with bay windows added to the two lower floors
- Ludwig Georgs Gymnasium in Darmstadt

=== Publications ===
- Max Taut: Bauten und Pläne, Berlin (1927) (in German)
- Alfred Kuhn: Max Taut – Bauten, Berlin (1932) (in German)
- Max Taut: Berlin im Aufbau, Berlin (1946) (in German)

== Bibliography ==
- Max Taut, exhibition catalogue with text by Julius Posener. ADK Berlin (1964) (in German)
- Max Taut – Zeichnungen, Bauten, exhibition catalogue. ADK Berlin (1984) (in German)
- Annette Menting: Max Taut. Das Gesamtwerk Munich: DVA (2003) (in German)
