= Fritz Bornemann =

German architect (1912–2007)

- Born: 12 February 1912; Berlin, Germany
- Died: 28 May 2007 (aged 95); Berlin, Germany
- Education: Technische Universität Berlin
- Occupation: Architect

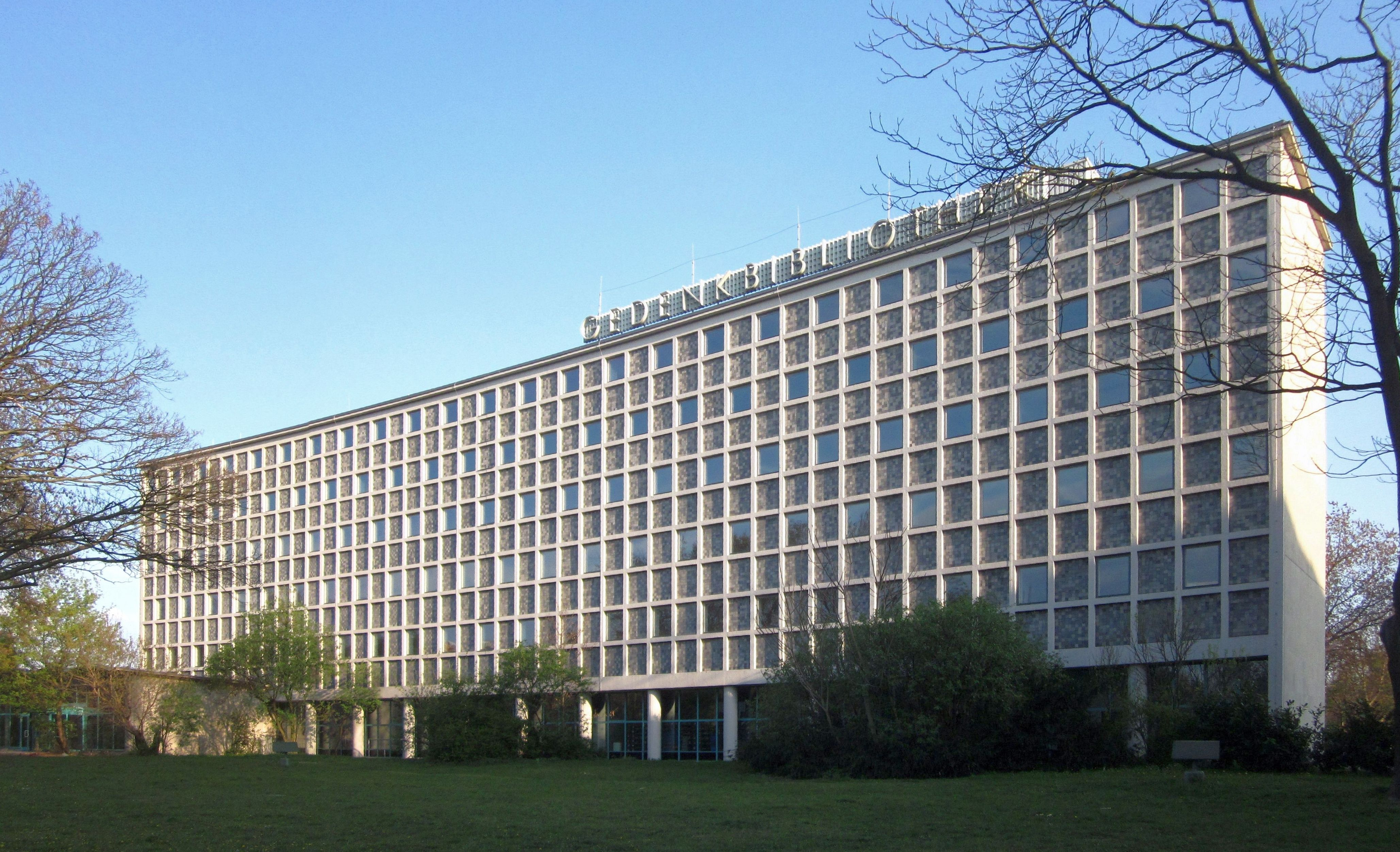
Amerika-Gedenk Bibliothek (America Commemoration Library), Berlin

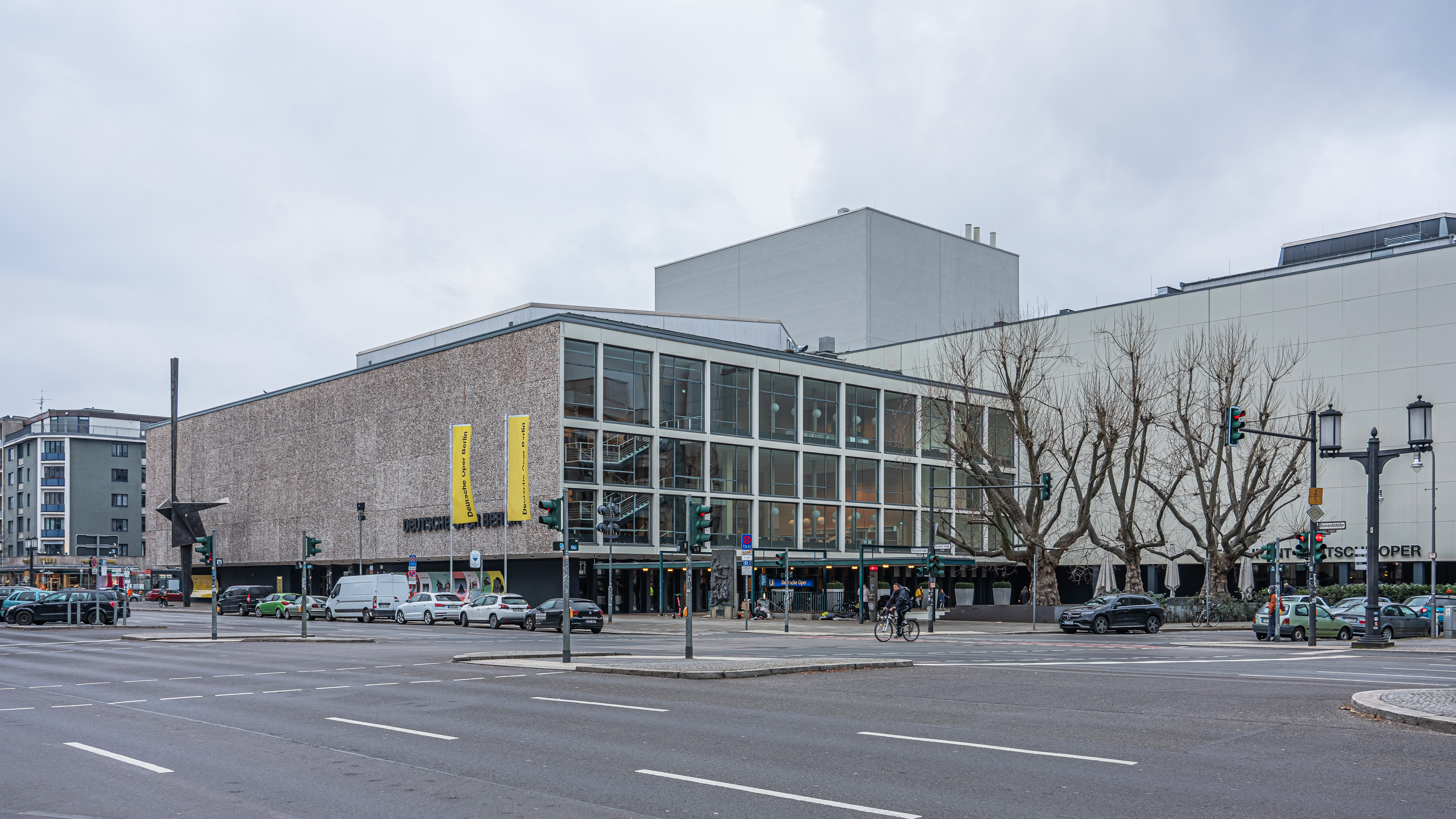
Deutsche Oper, Berlin

Fritz Bornemann (12 February 1912 in Berlin – 28 May 2007 in Berlin) was a German architect.

== Life and works ==
Bornemann studied architecture at the Technische Hochschule in Charlottenburg (now Technische Universität Berlin). After graduating in 1936, he was Assistant Scenic Designer at the Berlin Municipal Opera and, starting in 1945, Construction Supervisor with the city of Berlin. Since 1950 he became an independent architect active in Berlin. The designs for the Amerika-Gedenkbibliothek (America Commemoration Library) (1951–1955), the Deutsche Oper Berlin (1956–1961), the Freie Volksbühne (1961–1963) and the Museumszentrum Berlin-Dahlem (1966–1970) were drawn up by him. He also designed the headquarters of the Commerzbank Berlin (1969–1974).

The largely underground German Pavilion at Expo '70 (the spherical auditorium is out of view to the right))

He designed the German Pavilion for the 1970 World's Fair in Osaka (Japan). With this building Bornemann decisively renounced the large architectonic gesture by burying the exhibition area below ground; a spherical auditorium served for multimedia presentations of current trends in electronic music.

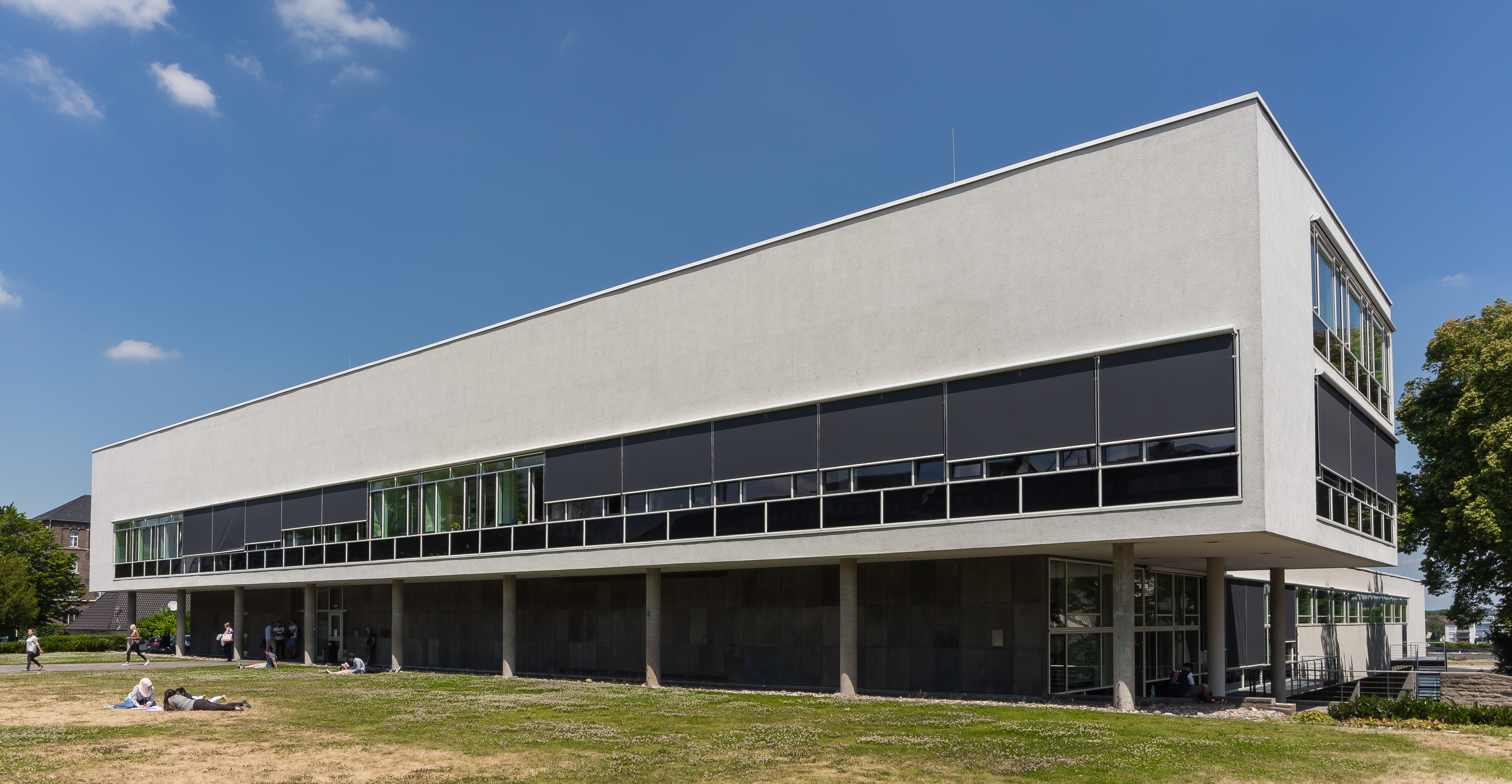
Building of the University Library in Bonn

Later there appeared, amongst others, the extension of the Rathaus of Berlin-Wedding and the University Library in Bonn. He never built residential houses.

Less well known is his work in multimedia. He designed some exhibitions, amongst them Atom (1953) and Farmer Smith (1957). The Osaka Pavilion was his crowning achievement in this field.

Bornemann's architecture was and is a subject of violent controversial opinions over the modern trends of the 1950s and 1960s. The critics speak of "cold" or "austere" architecture and belittle his buildings with expressions like "elegance in exposed-aggregate concrete." His adherents see in his work a model for modern architecture, and especially for modern theatre architecture.

For more than 16 years Fritz Bornemann was chairman of the Bund Deutscher Architekten (Association of German Architects).

== Competitions ==
- Imperial Palace in Addis Ababa, Ethiopia, 3rd Prize (1948)
- Municipal Theater of Gelsenkirchen, 2nd Prize (1953)
- Municipal Theater of Bonn, 2nd Prize (1960)
- Hanover Playhouse (1964)

== Awards ==
- Honorary membership in the Association of German Architects

== Sources ==
- Schindler, Susanne (ed.): Inszenierte Moderne. Zur Architektur von Fritz Bornemann. Berlin: Jovis Verlag. ISBN 3-936314-03-9
- Sigel, Paul. 2000. "Der deutsche Beitrag auf der Expo70 in Osaka." Arch plus no. 149–150 (April): 116–33. Reprinted online Thema 5, no. 1 (July 2000)
