= Karl Georg von Raumer =

German geologist and educator (1783–1865)

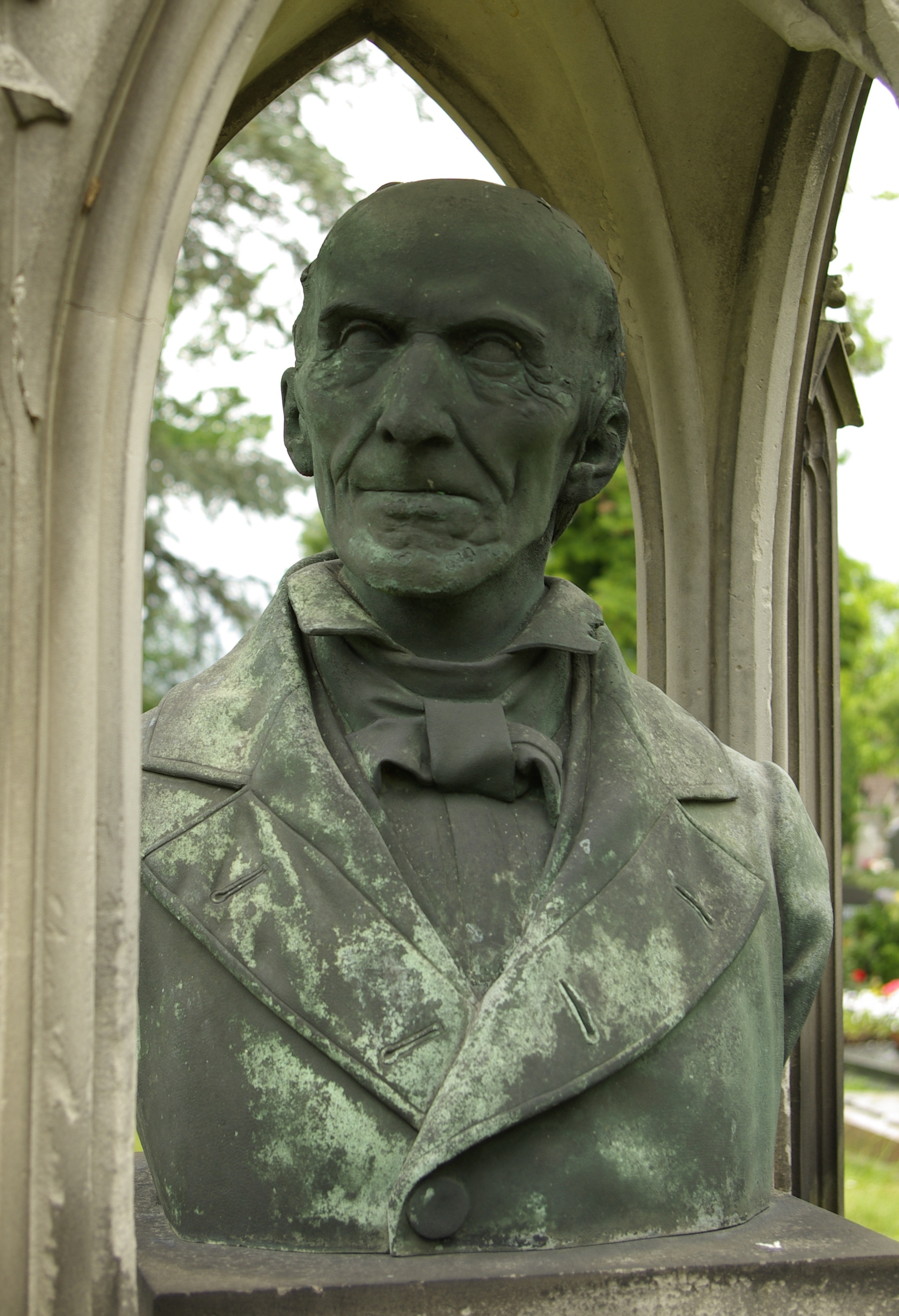
- Bust of Karl von Raumer in Erlangen

Karl Georg von Raumer (9 April 1783 – 2 June 1865) was a German geologist and educator.

== Biography ==
Raumer was born in Wörlitz, in Anhalt-Dessau. He was educated at the universities of Göttingen and Halle, and at the mining academy in Freiberg as a student of Abraham Gottlob Werner. In 1811 he became professor of mineralogy at Breslau, and two years later, participated in the German Campaign of 1813. In 1819 he relocated as a professor to the University of Halle, then in 1827 settled at the University of Erlangen as a professor of natural history and mineralogy. Raumer died in Erlangen.

== Writings ==
- Geognostische Fragmente (Geognostic fragments, 1811).
- Der Granit des Riesengebirges (The granite of the Riesengebirge, 1813).
- Das Gebirge Niederschlesiens, der Grafschaft Glatz und eines Theils von Böhmen und der Oberlausitz (The mountains of Lower Silesia, etc., 1819).
- A B C Buch der Krystallkunde (ABC's of crystallography, 1817, 1821).
- Lehrbuch der allgemeinen Geographie (Handbook of general geography, 1832).
- Kreuzzüge, (Crusades, 1840–64).
- Geschichte der Pädagogik (A history of pedagogy; 4 volumes, 1846–55). An important book on education which was translated into English; e.g. "German universities : contributions to the history and improvement of the German universities", translation of volume 4 from Raumer's ''Geschichte der Pädagogik.
- (In English): "Education of girls"; republished from Barnard's American Journal of Education, for March and June, 1861.
- Beschreibrung der Erdoberfläche (Description of the Earth's surface, 6th edition, 1866).

He also wrote an autobiography, published after his death in 1866.

== Family ==
He was the brother of the historian Friedrich Ludwig Georg von Raumer. His son Rudolf von Raumer was a noted philologist.

== Sources ==
- Rines, George Edwin, ed. (1920). "Raumer, Karl Georg von" . Encyclopedia Americana.
- Gilman, D. C.; Peck, H. T.; Colby, F. M., eds. (1905). "Raumer, Karl Georg von" . New International Encyclopedia (1st ed.). New York: Dodd, Mead.
- "Раумер, Карл Георг" . Brockhaus and Efron Encyclopedic Dictionary (in Russian). 1906.
