= Friedrich Ludwig Georg von Raumer =

German historian (1781–1873)

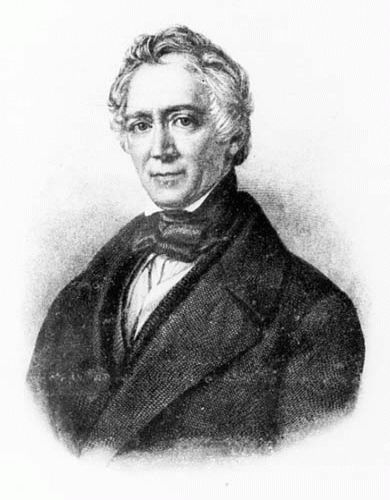
Friedrich von Raumer.

Friedrich Ludwig Georg von Raumer (14 May 1781 – 14 June 1873) was a German historian. He was the first scientific historian to popularise history in German. He travelled extensively and served in German legislative bodies.

== Biography ==
He was born at Wörlitz in Anhalt-Dessau. His father (who died in 1822), was Kammerdirektor (i.e. chamber director, head official in the financial department) in Anhalt and did great service to agriculture. After studying at the Joachimsthal Gymnasium, Berlin, and at the universities of Halle and Göttingen, Raumer began to practise law. He entered the Prussian civil service in 1801 as a civil magistrate, and rose in the service to become councillor to Chancellor Hardenberg in 1809.

He was made a professor at the University of Breslau in 1811, where he served until 1816. In 1819, he became professor of political science and history at the University of Berlin holding the chair until 1847, and giving occasional lectures until 1853. He was for some time secretary of the Prussian Academy of Sciences. That position he also resigned in 1847.

At different times between 1816 and 1855, he travelled extensively through Europe and the United States. In 1815, he carried on historical investigations in Venice, and in the two following years he travelled in Germany, Switzerland and Italy. He went to England in 1835, to Italy in 1839 and to the United States in 1841-1843. He revisited the United States 1853-55. These visits led to the publication of various works.

Returning from his 1841 journey through the United States Raumer was deeply impressed by the broad knowledge of average US citizens, whom he had encountered travelling on a Mississippi steam boat. His travel acquaintances ascribed their interest and knowledge to their access to books from public libraries and public lectures on various subjects. Raumer then started an initiative to open public libraries in Berlin too.

By the end of 1841 Raumer and other enthusiasts first founded the Verein für wissenschaftliche Vorträge (i.e. Association for scientific public lectures). The Verein, using the Singing Academy concert hall as its venue for lectures, succeeded to collect Thaler 4,000 (then about £ Sterling 592,59) forming the starting capital for Berlin's to-be-founded public libraries in 1846. Until the end of the 1870s the Verein raised and provided funds amounting to the sixfolds of this initial sum. The Verein, however, wanted the city of Berlin to give a helping hand and take the libraries under its auspices.

Raumer presented his ideas on public libraries, termed as Volksbibliotheken (people's libraries), in a memorandum in 1846, resonating his democratic opinions. As a result, in 1847 Berlin's magistrate (city government) established a standing committee for the establishment and administration of public libraries, consisting of members of the afore-mentioned Verein and of the City Representatives' Assembly (Stadtverordnetenversammlung; then Berlin's city parliament), of which Raumer was member in the parliamentary term of 1847/1848. In December 1848 King Frederick William IV of Prussia approved the foundation of public libraries, however, his decision remained unpublished due to the repercussions of the March Revolution of that year. With effect of 1 August 1850 the first four public libraries opened, numbered I to IV. The Library No. I was named after Raumer in 1955.

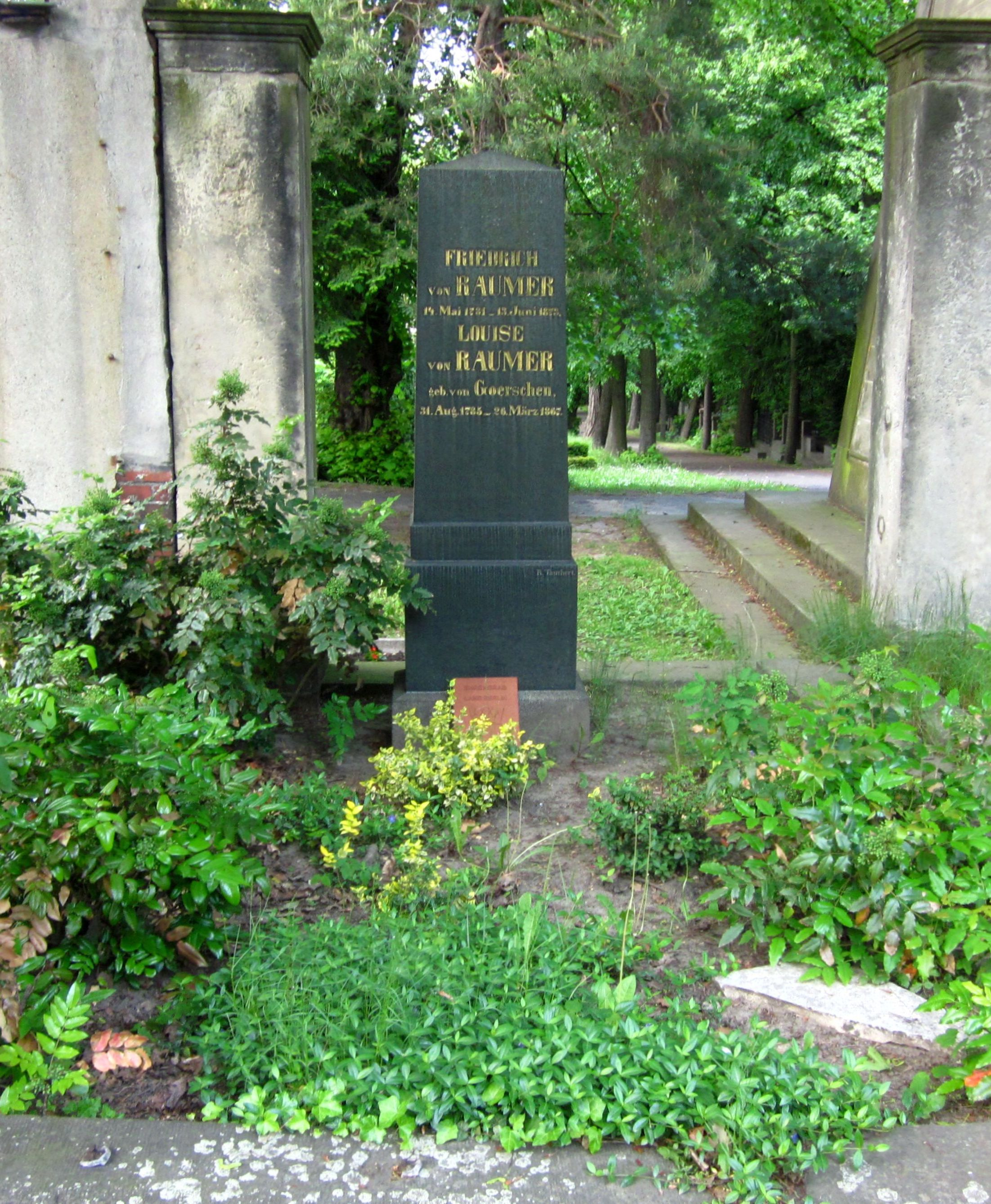
Grave of Friedrich von Raumer and his wife Louise, née von Görschen

In 1848 he was elected a member of the Frankfurt Parliament, where he associated himself with the right centre, supporting the proposal for a German empire under the supremacy of Prussia. He was sent to Paris as ambassador by imperial regent Archduke John of Austria, and was one of the deputation which offered the imperial crown to Frederick William IV. After the breakdown of the German parliament, Raumer returned to Berlin, where he was made a member of the House of Lords of Prussia.

He died at Berlin in 1873. His grave is preserved at a cemetery in the Kreuzberg section of Berlin, the Friedhof II der Dreifaltigkeits-Kirchengemeinde on Bergmannstraße, Berlin.

== Writings ==
His most famous works are Geschichte der Hohenstaufen und ihrer Zeit (1823–25) and Geschichte Europas seit dem Ende des 15ten Jahrhunderts (1832–50). His first work, published anonymously in 1806, was entitled Sechs Dialoge über Krieg und Handel.

Other works include:

- Das britische Besteuerungssystem (1810)
- Handbuch merkwürdiger Stellen aus den lateinischen Geschichtschreibern des Mittelalters (1813)
- Herbstreise nach Venedig (1816)
- Prussian Municipal Law (1828)
- Briefe aus Paris und Frankreich im Jahre 1830 (1831)
- Briefe aus Paris zur Erläuterung der Geschichte des 16ten und 17ten Jahrhunderts (1831)
  - History of the sixteenth and seventeenth centuries, illustrated by original documents (1835)
- Ueber die geschichtlich Entwickelung der Begriffe von Recht, Staat und Politik (1832)
- England in 1835 (1836)
- Beiträge zur neuern Geschichte aus dem Britischen Museum und Reichsarchive (Contributions to more recent history from the British Museum and government archives, 1836–39)
- Italien, Beiträge zur Kenntnis dieses Landes (Contributions to the understanding of Italy, 1840)
- England in 1841 (1842)
- Die Vereinigten Staaten von Nordamerika (The United States of North America, 1845)
- Antiquarische Briefe (Letters on antiquity, 1851)
- Historisch-politische Briefe über die geselligen Verhältnisse der Menschen (Historical-political letters on societal relationships, 1860)
- Lebenserinnerungen und Briefwechsel (Reminiscences and correspondence, 1861)
- Handbuch zur Geschichte der Literatur (Handbook of literary history, 1864–66)

In 1830, Raumer began the Historisches Taschenbuch published by F. A. Brockhaus, which was continued by Wilhelm Heinrich Riehl after 1871.

=== Evaluation ===
According to the 1911 Encyclopædia Britannica, "Raumer's style is direct, lucid and vigorous, and in his day he was a popular historian, but judged by strictly scientific standards he does not rank among the first men of his time." According to Appletons' Cyclopædia of American Biography, "He is justly considered as one of the great historians of the 19th century."

== Family ==
His brother, Karl Georg von Raumer, was a geologist and educator. Their cousins were Ernst Ludwig von Gerlach, a judge, politician, and editor, and Ludwig Friedrich Leopold von Gerlach, a general and confidant of Bismarck.

== Awards and honours ==
- Member of the Bavarian Academy of Sciences and Humanities (1830)
- Member of the Royal Swedish Academy of Sciences
- Member of the Academy of Sciences of Turin
- Member of the Academy of Sciences of Glasgow
- Honorary member of the Royal Society
- Honorary member of the Committee of Scholars of the Germanisches Nationalmuseum (1857)
- Bavarian Maximilian Order for Science and Art (1853)
- Pour le Mérite für Wissenschaft und Künste (1863)
- Friedrich von Raumer Library, named after him in 1955
