= Berlin Central and Regional Library =

Official library in Germany

Coordinates: 52°30′55″N 13°24′16″E

- Zentral- und Landesbibliothek Berlin (ZLB)

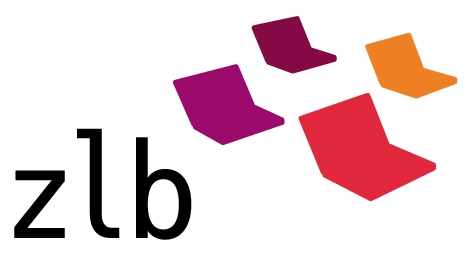
- Corporate design of ZLB
- Location: Berlin-Mitte; Berlin-Charlottenburg; Berlin-Kreuzberg, Germany
- Type: City and Regional library
- Established: 1995

Collection
- Size: 3.4 million
- Legal deposit: Yes, Berlin Senate and State

Access and use
- Circulation: 4.24 million (2008)

Other information
- Director: Dr. Jonas Fansa
- Website: www.zlb.de

The Berlin Central and Regional Library (German: Zentral- und Landesbibliothek Berlin) or ZLB is the official library of the City and State of Berlin, Germany. It was established as a Foundation by two State laws, initially in 1995 and amended in 2005, combining the following institutions:

- America Memorial Library (German: Amerika-Gedenkbibliothek), one of the largest public libraries in Berlin opened in 1954 and initially co-funded with a grant from the United States
- Berlin City Library (German: Berliner Stadtbibliothek), the municipal library of the city founded in 1901
- Berlin Senate Library (German: Senatsbibliothek Berlin), the official library of the Berlin Senate, founded on 22 December 1948.
- Berlin General Catalog (German: Berliner Gesamtkatalog or BGK)

In 2011 the library system had more than 3.4 million electronic and printed media.

The Foundation is a legal deposit library for all publications appearing in Berlin. The ZLB also has significant historical and estate collections, and operates the Center for Berlin Studies in Ribbeck-House. The ZLB is a member of the Public Libraries in Berlin (VÖBB) and the Cooperative Library Network of Berlin-Brandenburg (KOBV). Partner libraries are the Centre Georges Pompidou in Paris and the Rudomino All-Russian State Library for Foreign Literature in Moscow.

== Locations ==
- Berlin-Kreuzberg Blücherplatz 1 (America Memorial Library)
- Berlin-Mitte Breite Strasse 30–36 (Berlin City Library)
- Berlin-Charlottenburg (Berlin Senate Library)

There had been plans to combine the three institutions in a new building at the former Tempelhof Airport, but a 2014 referendum ended the Berlin Senate's plans to open parts of the airport's outfield for development. Debate about a centralised location continued, and in 2018, Blücherplatz was slated as the site for a new central library building. The existing America Memorial Library, which is listed as a historic monument, will have to remain part of the new ensemble. Construction is not expected to start before 2025.

== See also ==
- Berlin State Library
- German National Library
- Kunstbibliothek Berlin
- List of libraries in Germany
