= Eduard Reyer =

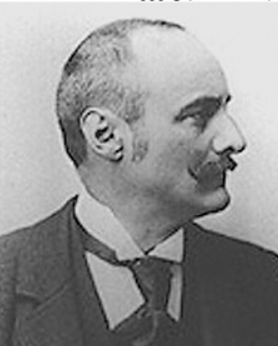

Eduard Alexander August Reyer (10 May 1849 – 12 July 1914) was an Austrian geologist, jurist, and educator. He served as a professor of geology at the University of Vienna where he shifted away from geology as an observational field to an experimental one by introducing qualitative and semi-quantitative experiments in stratigraphy and deformations.

Reyer was born in Salzburg, son of surgeon Alexander Reyer and Sophie née Kees. The family moved to Cairo when his father went to head the Cairo Medical School in 1850. Reyer grew up in Cairo where he studied briefly before going to Trieste and then Munich, and Graz. He also received private tuitions and graduated in 1866 from a Gymnasium in Graz. He then studied law at Graz, Leipzig and Vienna, receiving a doctorate in law from the University of Innsbruck in 1871. He then became interested in the sciences and went to Leipzig where he studied paleontology under Carl Credner, petrology under Ferdinand Zirkel and earth science under Karl Friedrich Zöllner and Karl Gustav Bischof. He also studied chemistry at the University of Vienna and Heidelberg, attending lectures by Wilhelm Bunsen, Hermann Franz Moritz Kopp, and Gustav Robert Kirchhoff. He continued geology studies at Vienna under Eduard Suess, Gustav Tschermak and Melchior Neumayr. He travelled in the South Tyrol with Edmund Mojsisovics von Mojsvár. In 1876 he became a lecturer at Vienna. In 1881 Suess recommended his appointment as an associate professor of geology which happened the next year, although without a salary. In 1911 he became a full professor but in 1912 he retired due to poor health. He died at a sanatorium in Jena.

Reyer examined mountain formation theories, the role of volcanism and various other ideas in geology. In addition to geology he contributed to historical and sociological studies particularly of Tuscany and of a mining town in Germany. Born in a family of wealth, he favoured private enterprise and demonstrated the inefficiency of state managed enterprises such as the management of malaria. He was interested in adult education and promoted the establishment of public libraries and educational institutions. In 1891 he served with the management of the Leopoldstadt Library increasing book circulation figures. He believed that libraries should have lending fees so as to make the public take responsibility.
