= Rudolf von Raumer =

German philologist and linguist (1815–1876)

Rudolf von Raumer (14 April 1815, Breslau – 30 August 1876, Erlangen) was a German philologist and linguist, known for his extensive research of the German language. He was the son of geologist Karl Georg von Raumer.

== Biography ==
He studied classical and Germanic philology at the universities of Erlangen and Göttingen, where his instructors were Friedrich Christoph Dahlmann and Jacob Grimm. From 1840, he was privatdocent at the University of Erlangen, where in 1846 he became an associate professor. In 1852, he became a full professor of German language and literature at Erlangen.

In 1870, he wrote his major work, volume 9 of a series entitled Geschichte der Wissenschaften in Deutschland, which was entitled Geschichte der Germanischen Philologie vorzugsweise in Deutschland. He is cited in Konrad Duden's Die deutsche Rechtschreibung in the preface as a significant influence for this writing.

In regards to historical and comparative phonology, Raumer understood the need for more specific phonetic concepts and vocabulary, and he proposed numerous refinements and clarifications in that area. He stressed the basic role of Jacob Grimm's work and the need to advance beyond it. He also conducted comprehensive research on German dialectology and orthography. In 1876, his ideas for spelling reform were partially carried out by the Prussian government.

== Published works ==
He published Fortsetzung der untersuchungen über die urverwandtschaft der semitischen und indoeuropäischen sprachen (Investigations into the ancient relationship between the Semitic and Indo-European languages, 1867 et seq.). His other written efforts include:

- Die Aspiration und die Lautverschiebung; eine sprachgeschichtliche Untersuchung, 1837 – The aspiration and the sound shift.
- Die Einwirkung des Christenthums auf die althochdeutsche Sprache: ein Beitrag zur Geschichte der deutschen Kirche, 1845 – The influence of Christianity on the Old High German language.
- Das deutsche Wörterbuch der Gebrüder Grimm und die Entwickelung der deutschen Schriftsprache, 1858 – The German dictionary of the Brothers Grimm and the development of the written German language.
- Gesammelte sprachwissenschaftliche Schriften, 1863 – Collected linguistic writings.
- Herr Professor Schleicher in Jena und Die Urverwandtschaft der semitischen und indoeuropäischen Sprachen. Ein kritisches Bedenken, 1864 – Professor August Schleicher in Jena and the relationship of Semitic and Indo-European languages.
- Geschichte der germanischen Philologie vorzugsweise in Deutschland, 1870 – History of Germanic philology, especially in Germany.
- Der Unterricht im Deutschen, 1873 – Lessons in the German language.

== Sources ==
- "Раумер, Рудольф" . Brockhaus and Efron Encyclopedic Dictionary (in Russian). 1906.
