= Amerika-Gedenkbibliothek =

Public library in Berlin

Coordinates: 52°29′47″N 13°23′30″E

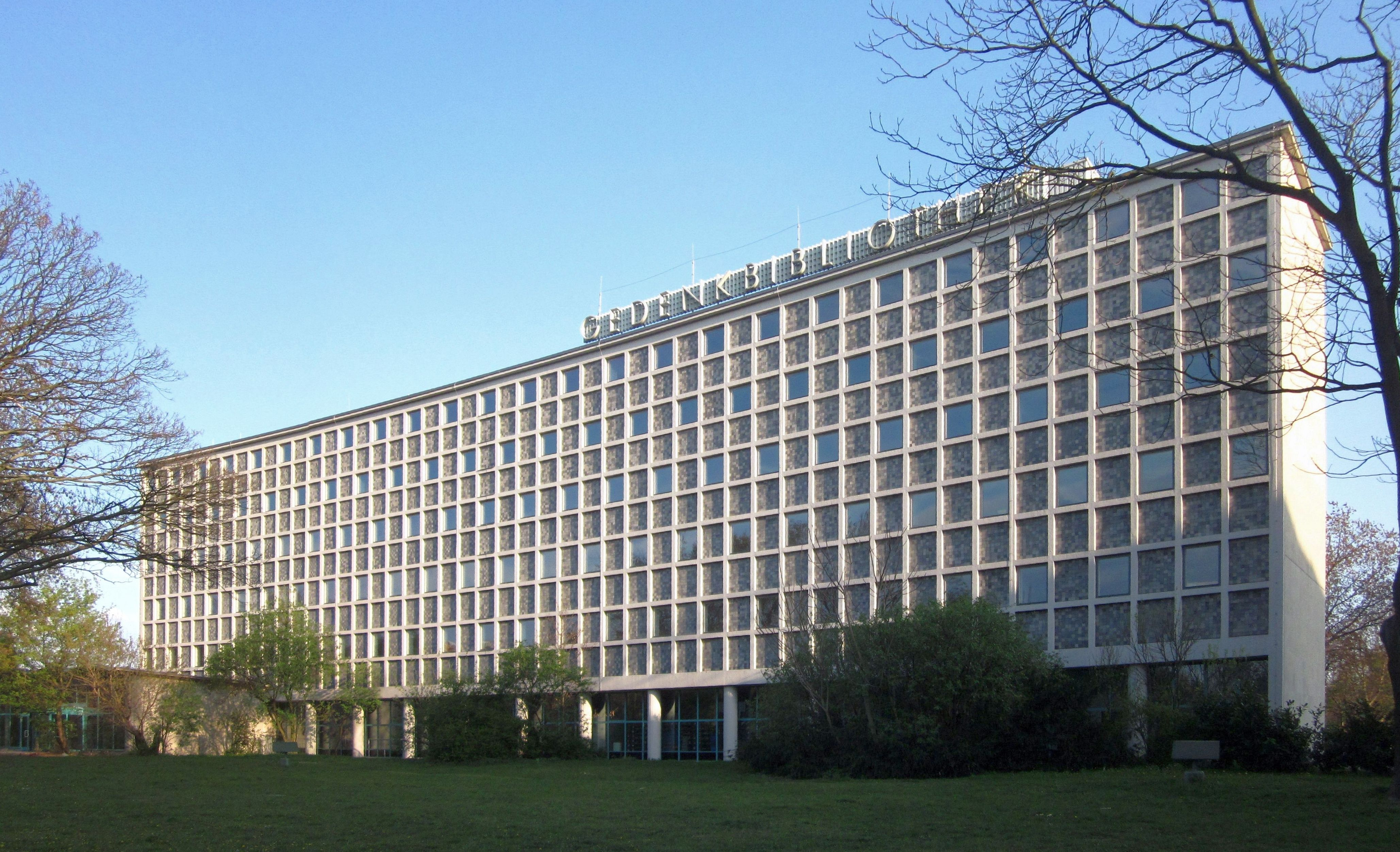
- Location: Hallesches Tor / Blücherplatz, 10961 Berlin, Germany
- Established: 1954

Collection
- Size: 900,000

Other information
- Director: Volker Heller
- Employees: unknown

Amerika-Gedenkbibliothek

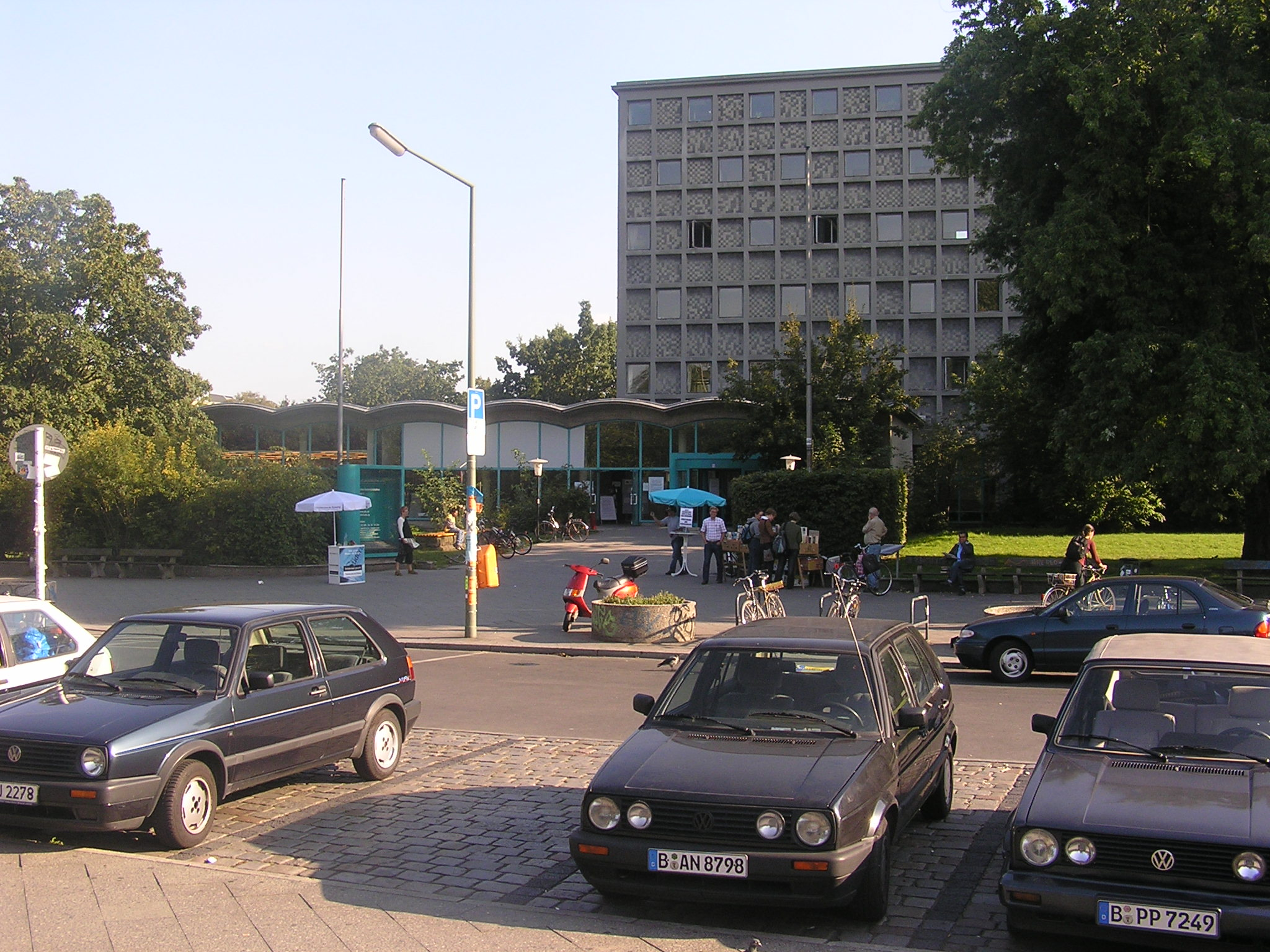
Main entrance

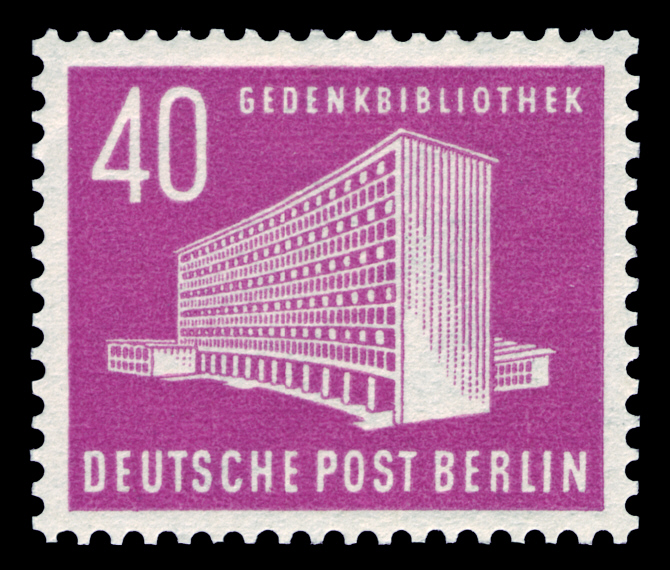
Amerika-Gedenkbibliothek

The Amerika-Gedenkbibliothek (AGB; English: America Memorial Library) is one of the largest public libraries in Berlin, Germany. It was co-financed by a donation from the United States. The building was designed by American and German architects, including Fritz Bornemann and Willy Kreuer. It was opened on September 17, 1954, and was originally planned to become the Central Library of Berlin.

== History ==
In 1950 the American people had donated $5 million (=DM 21 million; so-called McCloy Grant) for cultural purposes in recognition of the West Berliners' keeping up during the Berlin Blockade, which took place in 1948/1949. With DM 5.4 million (=$1.285 million) from the grant, the new library was built on Blücherplatz in Kreuzberg. On 10 September 1954 it opened to become Berlin's central public library. With the construction of the Berlin Wall and the separation of the city in 1961, this concept lapsed. The library was then the major public library in West Berlin. A third of the users were local Kreuzbergers who prior used to frequent one of the four smaller public libraries in their borough.

Part of the attractiveness of the AGB derived from it being an American-type open access library, whereas most of Berlin's other libraries held by then only small shares of their bookstock in open access, usually only the non-lending collection. So opening the AGB again gave the Berlin libraries another push forwards in their development. On 31 March 1955, after years of campaigning, Alexander Dehms (1904–1979; head of Kreuzberg's public libraries from 1949 to 1969 and member of the House of Representatives of Berlin), succeeded in putting the Berliner Büchereigesetz (Berlin Library Act) through which provided for an expansion, better funding and improved equipment of West Berlin's public libraries through budgetary items earmarked for libraries.

In 1988 the City of Berlin sponsored an invited competition for a 150,000-square-foot addition to the library. The original library had been built as a result of a German competition with American funds. This competition was funded by the German Government with the ambition to select an American-based architect. Fifteen American firms were invited to participate. The jury selected three first prizes: Steven Holl, Lars Lerup and Karen Van Lengen. One year later after two additional rounds of refinements and presentations an international jury selected Karen Van Lengen as the final winner. By 1992, Van Lengen's firm completed almost 75% of the design work before the City of Berlin cancelled the project due to lack of funding. With the collapse of the Berlin Wall and its accompanying unexpected financial challenges, the city abandoned plans for the library expansion. On its 50th birthday, the library was honored for having been a symbol of freedom in times of political instability and the divided country. Today, the Amerika-Gedenkbibliothek, the Berlin City Library and the Berlin Senate Library form the Berlin Central and Regional Library (German: Zentral- und Landesbibliothek Berlin).

== Collections ==
The Amerika-Gedenkbibliothek hosts collections of the humanities and social sciences. Special collections that enrich the basic portfolio include “Berolinensien”, old children's books, the Kleist Archive, the Arno Holz Archive, the Willibald Alexis Archive, music of the U.S. and “Kunst der jungen Generation” (“Young Generation’s Art”).

== Children's library ==
The children's library and its youth department, “Hallescher Komet”, is named after the library's location at the metro station Hallesches Tor, while also being a pun on the German name of Halley's Comet, Halleyscher Komet. The Youth Information Center offers advice, entertainment, and information regarding routine problems. Additionally, extracurricular leisure time facilities and a variety of courses, including homework support, are provided, in addition to the pro bono legal service and the “How to write application” course.

== Bibliography ==
- Christine-Dorothea Sauer, Paul S. Ulrich: Zuverlässige Brücke zu den Informationen im Netz. Von der Allgemeinen Auskunft der Amerika-Gedenkbibliothek zum Referat Informationsdienste der Zentral- und Landesbibliothek Berlin. In: BuB – Forum für Bibliothek und Information. 10/11 56 2004, S. 673–677.
- Daniela Schoßau: Die Amerika-Gedenkbibliothek – Die Verwirklichung einer mächtigen Idee. In: BuB – Forum für Bibliothek und Information. 56(2004)5, S. 322–325.
- Susanne Hein: Vom Mittelalter zur Moderne. Fünfzig Jahre Musik in der AGB Berlin. In: BuB – Forum für Bibliothek und Information. 56(2004)6, S. 388–390.
- Peter Delin, Ursula Müller-Schüßler, Christian Wollert: Kunstabteilung und Videosammlung. In: BuB – Forum für Bibliothek und Information. 56(2004)7/8, S. 452–455.
