= Mendelssohn Palace =

- Mendelssohn-Palais
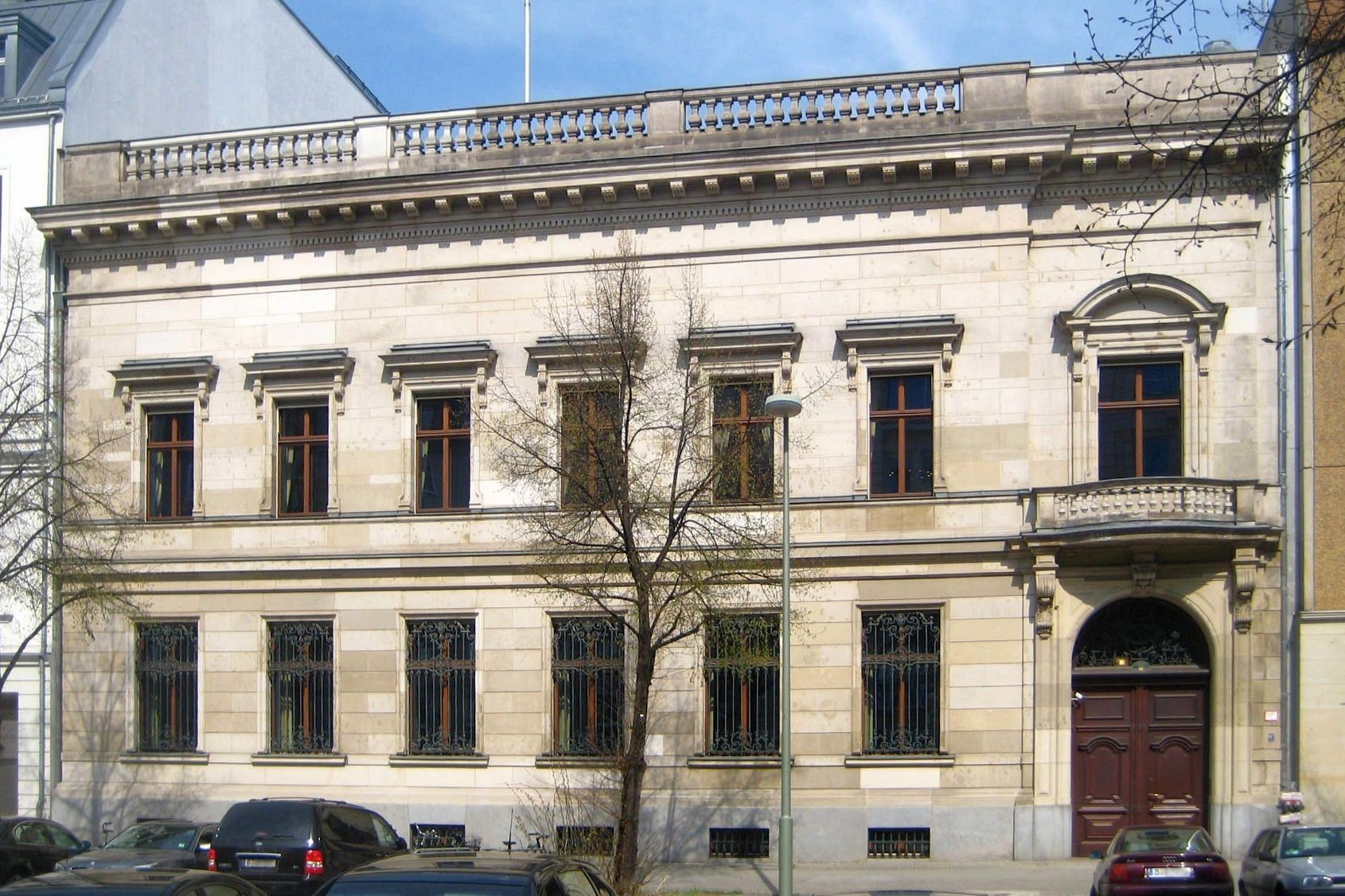
- Mendelssohn Palace, 2010
- Interactive map of the Mendelssohn Palace area

General information
- Type: Palace
- Architectural style: Neoclassical
- Location: Berlin, Germany
- Coordinates: 52°30′52″N 13°23′42″E
- Completed: 1893

Height
- Height: 16 m (52 ft)

Design and construction
- Architects: Martin Gropius, Heino Schmieden

The Mendelssohn Palace (German: Mendelssohn-Palais) is a Neoclassical-style building in Berlin-Mitte. Designed by the architects Martin Gropius and Heino Schmieden, the palace was completed in 1893. The building functioned as a residence- and bank building for the Mendelssohn family. Partly destroyed in World War II, the undamaged remnant of the palace is currently seat of a business company.

== Bibliography ==
- "Bankhaus Mendelssohn & Co." in Handbuch der Deutschen Kunstdenkmäler. München/Berlin: Deutscher Kunstverlag, 2006. pp. 123. ISBN 3-422-03111-1
