= Carl Großmann =

German serial killer and sexual predator

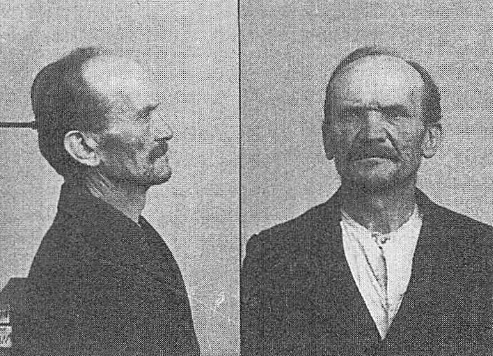
- Mug shot of Großmann
- Born: Karl Friedrich Wilhelm Großmann; 13 December 1863; Alt Ruppin, Province of Brandenburg, Kingdom of Prussia
- Died: 5 July 1922 (aged 58); Berlin, Free State of Prussia, Weimar Republic
- Cause of death: Suicide by hanging
- Other names: Karl Grossmann; Beast of Silesian Train Station; Berlin Butcher; Blue Beard of Berlin; German Jack the Ripper; German Landru
- Convictions: Assault; Rape
- Penalty: 15 years imprisonment (for child molestation)

Details
- Victims: 26–100+
- Span of crimes: 1918–1921
- Country: Germany
- State: Berlin
- Date apprehended: 21 August 1921

Karl Friedrich Wilhelm Großmann (13 December 1863 – 5 July 1922), better known as Carl Großmann, (Note: "Karl" was the legal name used on government documentation. Großmann himself wrote his first name as "Carl", the informal spelling also used by his father, and insisted upon its writing in court. Reports at the time, both in English and in German, spelled the name "Karl", as do most modern German sources. Modern English sources typically use "Carl", the spelling more common in the English language) was a German serial killer and rapist who murdered at least twenty women in the Friedrichshain quarter of Berlin between 1918 and 1921. He killed himself while awaiting the end of his trial without giving a full confession.

== Early life ==
=== Childhood ===
Großmann was born in Alt Ruppin (now part of Neuruppin) as one of seven children (Note: Großmann initially stated that he had three brothers and five sisters before reducing this count to two brothers and four sisters. This number does not include half-siblings on his mother's side.) to rag picker Karl G. Friedrich Großmann and Marie Dorothea Sophie "Sophia" Prößel (or Brüssel). Of his two brothers and four sisters, Großmann was closest to his half-brother Franz, who corroborated most of Großmann's own testimony about his childhood. His father was an alcoholic and locally regarded as an ill-tempered brute, who was often arrested for starting fights with other townsfolk, also regularly beating his wife and children in drunken rages using a fire poker. Großmann was often singled out in the abuse, as his father "hated how alike they were", and forced his son under threat of death to lie to teachers about the bruises, claiming that they were the result of accidents while playing.

Großmann was widely disliked and mocked for his ugly appearance and body odor. His brother Franz said that Großmann began voicing violent thoughts and sadistic sexual tastes in his youth. Early on, Großmann developed a fascination with the slaughter of animals, delighting in the flow of blood and final death throes. In one instance, when Großmann was six years old, he and his half-brother assisted in the slaughter of a pig at the local abattoir. The brothers were supposed to catch any run-off blood in a bowl, but when the butcher cut the pig's jugular vein, Großmann pushed his brother aside, opened his mouth, and gulped up as much blood as he could from the gushing stream. Franz Großmann described how his brother was "seizing as if he were having an epileptic fit" before an adult worker shoved the boy away. Großmann reportedly told his brother later in life that he could only achieve arousal at the sight of blood. Childhood friend Fritz Schirrmeister recalled a time when he slaughtered an injured rabbit for food while Großmann watched, noticing his friend's oddly pleased facial expression and fixed gaze on the animal's twitching.

From an early age, Großmann assisted his father's merchant business as a crier and tended to the family's goats kept in nearby Treskow. Neighbours often observed the young boy playfully smashing heads with one particular billy goat and covering his face and chest in salt to have the goats lick him, leading to Großmann being nicknamed "Zickenkarl" ("Nanny Goat Karl") for his overt fondness for the animals.

Großmann left Volksschule in the third grade, shortly after which he had his Evangelical confirmation. Großmann claimed to have continued school for a few years while working at a local fabric factory, but did not possess higher education.

=== Adolescence ===
In 1876, he took an apprenticeship as a slaughterhouse worker at the meat shop of Ferdinand Kliefoth, who took the troublemaking youth in despite his unpopular reputation, having seen his potential as a slaughterer given his deftness with a knife and lack of aversion to blood. Großmann told his brother that he only took the position to get close to Klieforth's wife Dorothea and that he often had wet dreams about forcing himself on her. In 1879, Großmann was dismissed after he was caught attempting to rape Dorothea, and beaten by Klieforth as a result. According to Großmann, he never finished a proper course as either a slaughterer or butcher. He returned to selling cloth with his father, occasionally working as a laborer at the fabric factory. Großmann was thrown out of the house in 1880 for stealing money from his father. Großmann claimed that he moved to Berlin with friends at age 16.

== Crimes ==
=== Vagrancy and sex offenses ===
Berlin court records showed that his earliest available conviction was in 1882, at age 19, for vagrancy, with the court in Rixdorf noting that he already had an extensive history of begging and unemployment. In the following four years, he was convicted of theft, attempted blackmail, threat, and property damage. He was jailed thrice for assault in the years 1886, 1887, and 1888. Between 1886 and 1887, Großmann served in the Imperial German Army, in the 12th Grenadier Regiment in Frankfurt an der Oder, until he was discharged for a criminal arrest for rape, spending one year in prison. In 1889, Großmann received another one-year sentence by Amtsgericht Charlottenburg for aggravated assault. Upon his release in 1890, Großmann worked for numerous butcher shops and slaughterhouses in Berlin-Mitte, subsidizing his income as a peddler of matches and other households items. In relation to his unsolicited sales, he was jailed twice for begging, once for fraud and once for trespassing, serving a total jail time of six months and two weeks by 1893.

Großmann left Berlin in 1894 after failing to find steady employment and became a vagrant traversing southern Germany during the late 1890s, making a living through begging, peddling, and theft. Over the years, Großmann was sentenced at the courts of Heidelberg, Dresden, Aachen, Ludwigsburg, and Mannheim. In the Neckar area of Baden and Württemberg, his arrests were primarily for vagrancy, trespassing, and fraud. One-off convictions included physical insult, resisting arrest, and bestiality. On 3 January 1896, a gardener couple alerted police after hearing their nanny goat screaming, with officers finding Großmann inside the stable, at the hooves of the animal and hiding under an Inverness coat. He first claimed to have only trespassed for nightly shelter, but an examination of the goat showed that it had severe swelling around the genitalia while Großmann was "wet around the knees" and had the fly of his pants open. He was subsequently sentenced to 10 months imprisonment for sodomy by a court in Mannheim.

In the Franconian region of Bavaria, his criminal record included assault, petty burglary, and sex crimes against young girls. His first charge was for the rape of a four-year-old girl. The longest of these first sentences, 15 months' imprisonment, was served in Nuremberg, after Großmann was convicted in 1897 for molesting a twelve-year-old girl. After being released on 1 April 1899, Großmann molested a ten-year-old girl and raped a four-year-old girl. A court in Bayreuth sentenced him to 15 years' imprisonment for the rapes on 4 October 1899; the four-year-old died of an infection from a complete tearing of the perineum inflicted during the attack shortly after the judgement. During his sentence at Ebrach prison, Großmann continued his violent behaviour and received 55 citations for unprovoked fights with fellow inmates.

=== Murders ===
After his release from prison in August 1914, Großmann again moved to Berlin. Despite the start of World War I just a few days earlier, he was not drafted due to his age. Initially supporting himself with peddling, Großmann rented out the kitchen habitation in the third-floor apartment of Mannheim Itzig at Lange Straße 88, in the area around Berlin Ostbahnhof, known at the time for its high rates of crime, unemployment, and prostitution. Although Großmann was a one-room lodger, he often had the apartment to himself as Itzig and his family were rarely home. Neighbors described Großmann as a quiet man, only remembered for his particularly repulsive looks and stench. Residents admitted to often hearing loud noises and screaming from his flat, but did not think more of it, believing Großmann was only having rough sex with prostitutes, which was not uncommon in the quarter. Großmann sold meat on the black market and managed a sausage stand at Andreas Square outside the train station. According to admissions made to the court after his arrest, Großmann kept constant savings of around 10,000 marks from his income as a peddler.

Beginning in at least 1918, Großmann used his location near Ostbahnhof to approach women, often job-seekers from the countryside newly arrived by train, and lure them to his home by offering them work as a domestic housekeeper. Some surviving victims said that they interpreted this as a code for solicitation, while others genuinely believed they would be given employment. At the apartment, Großmann would physically overpower the woman and rape her, though other times, he would let the victim do housekeeping for several days or weeks before drugging and sexually assaulting her. Some of the women were let go after agreeing not to report Großmann, while others were killed at Großmann's discretion. He would dump his victims' remains in Luisenstadt Canal and the adjoining Engelbecken basin. After each encounter, Großmann reported the women, whether dead or alive, to police, claiming they had run away after stealing from him to either explain their disappearance or disparage potential accusations made by surviving victims. On occasion, Großmann also targeted local women, ranging from female labourers, stay-at-home mothers, and sex workers, all invariably from poor financial backgrounds. Großmann's activities went mostly unnoticed due to the political climate of the time, during which Berlin Police was largely occupied with quelling armed protests.

==== Known and confessed incidents ====
Großmann had been occasionally reported to the authorities, but a criminal investigation was never launched until his arrest. On 24 March 1920, 66-year-old downstairs neighbour Gertrud Grabowski called a social worker when she heard crying from upstairs. Grabowski said that she initially believed that Großmann had once more invited a prostitute, but soon recognised the voice as belonging to a child. The social worker found a 15-year-old girl in Großmann's flat and ordered police to the scene. The girl said that Großmann had invited her into his room and digitally penetrated her as she slept, while Großmann claimed that he had tried to undress her for a bath. The matter was not pursued further since the girl was a homeless runaway and did not press charges. The social worker demanded a house search after she realised that there was women's clothing in Großmann's possession and that Großmann had lied when claiming that they belonged to a deceased wife, but was ignored by the officers.

On 21 October 1920, police searched Großmann's apartment after one of his surviving victims, Martha Baltzer, went to police and accused Großmann of murdering a friend of hers, 33-year-old sex worker Frieda Schubert, who had disappeared on 2 October. Baltzer's testimony was supported by Schubert's fiancé Otto Tannenbaum, who also recalled last seeing her with Großmann. Two women were found in the company of Großmann, but police concluded that nothing pointed towards Großmann having any involvement in Schubert's disappearance.

In early August 1921, Großmann picked up a homeless woman, had lunch with her and invited her to stay with him for the night. In the flat, Großmann told the woman he would pay her if she allowed him to tie her up, claiming that he had a bondage fetish and would masturbate at the sight. He instead tried to rape her by throwing her on the bed, but the woman dodged and ran for the door. Großmann incapacitated the woman by hitting her in the face with a pestle and dragging her back into the bed, then gagged her with a towel. While Großmann watched her suffocate to death, Helene Itzig, the wife of his landlord, arrived unannounced. Entering his room, Itzig first believed she had only caught Großmann sleeping with a sex worker, but was horrified when she pulled away the blanket and found that the woman was motionless and had a broken, bleeding nose. She ran out of the apartment, but returned without alerting police. Großmann lied by explaining that he drugged the woman and was simply "getting more time with her" this way. Negative and hostile attitudes against sex workers were widespread at the time, so Itzig did not question this further and left after being paid off with 50 marks, supposedly to keep quiet about his solicitation habits. Großmann fell asleep next to the body and dismembered her two hours later when he woke up. Großmann only named the victim as "Martha", but she has since been identified as 30-year-old Elisabeth Barthel.

On 14 August 1921, Großmann was booked on assault charges for getting into a fight with a man who had confronted Großmann over the disappearance of his sister, 29-year-old Johanna Sosnowski, whom Großmann later confessed to killing on 3 August. Großmann was released without a trial date, and the allegation was not further investigated.

Two other victims who reported Großmann for rape, Emma B. and Frieda T., were disregarded by police because of Großmann's theft accusations and because they were known prostitutes. Another woman, known only as "Polish Anna", was arrested and jailed until well after Großmann's arrest, after she was found with four 100 mark notes, which had been marked by Großmann, hidden in her stocking.

During this time, dismembered human remains were appearing nearly daily in Berlin's Spree River, primarily in the Luisenstadt Canal. Only two victims, the missing Frieda Schubert and Johanna Sosnowski, could be definitively identified. Some of the remains were estimated to have been in the water for 8 to 14 days. The body parts belonged to at least 23 women, but the sheer amount led some investigators to suspect that Großmann may have murdered up to 100 women and girls. Dismembered human remains had been washing up since March 1920, but it is difficult to estimate the exact number of victims due to the corpses of Reichswehr officers also having been thrown into the Spree during the Kapp Putsch and retrieved bodies not being thoroughly examined following that event. A 5000 mark reward was issued for help in identifying the suspected murderer of the unknown women. Police asked through newspaper columns for residents to come forwards and identify the bodies. In August 1921, at least twelve people answered the request, leading to three possible, but unconfirmed identifications as Else Thiese, Margarete Simon, and Wilhelmine Poppel, as well as one accusation against a certain Ernst Brandt, which was also not investigated.

It was rumored and widely reported by contemporary newspapers that the meat Großmann sold contained the remains of his victims, as he used the same locations where he disposed of the women's remains to debone fish and other animals for his business. Police at the time and later assessment by historians have dismissed the cannibal rumours, popularly called "Braut auf der Stulle" ("[a] broad on sliced bread"), as unfounded and likely an invention by tabloid newspapers to boost sales.

== Arrest ==
On 21 August 1921, a neighbour of Großmann, labourer Robert Iglitzki, was awoken by his wife, who had heard screams and banging noises from above, followed by silence at around 21:30. At her insistence, Iglitzki went to the 50th precinct Andreaswache and led two police officers, Karl Klähn and Ernst Engesser, to Großmann's apartment. Großmann refused to open the door despite repeated knocking by officers, who then burst into the apartment. Arresting officer Klähn saw Großmann with visibly bloodied hands about to attempt suicide by drinking muckefuck laced with cyanide, which was prevented when Klähn knocked the cup out of his hand. Immediately after Großmann was handcuffed by Engesser, Klähn found the body of a nude female on the bed. The woman was still alive, but died seconds after being discovered. She was identified as 34-year-old Marie Nitsche (née Paul), an occasional sex worker from Dresden who had been released from Moabit jail the same day. Witnesses confirmed that Nitsche had been picked up by Großmann at Koppenstraße and that the pair spent the evening at a nearby carnival, using rides and drinking beer, until around 21:00.

News of the police's findings spread quickly, leading to hundreds of residents gathering outside the building within the next hour. When Großmann was walked to the precinct on foot at around midnight, police had to keep dozens of armed civilians from attacking him. He was handed over to the homicide department at the main police station at Alexanderplatz and charged with murder. Newspapers immediately reported that Großmann was linked to six murders, later lowered to five, and named at least seven missing women as potentially tied to the case.

=== Investigation ===
The majority of victims died by asphyxiation or blunt trauma while bound to a bed. In the former case, Großmann usually shoved a hand into their mouths and watched their deaths for several minutes. Neighbours reported that he seemed to have had a steady supply of female companions, mostly destitute-looking young women, over the previous few years. Residents estimated that they had seen him with around 150 different women who had presumably taken him up on the supposed housekeeping position. How many lives Großmann took is not known, and Großmann only gave first names when reporting his housekeepers to police. Since Großmann came in frequently and his theft accusations were low priority, the number of times he filed complaints, as well as the names themselves, were often not recorded. (Note: The identification of Großmann's victims, whether living or deceased, was difficult as many names he gave to police when accusing the domestic servants of theft were common and thus appeared multiple times. Repeated mentions included names as Johanna, Margarete, Maria, Martha, Helene, Emma, Frieda, and Anna.) Only the body of his final victim was found, along with bloodstains in the apartment that indicated at least two other persons had been butchered in the few weeks leading up to his arrest.

Investigators estimated that around 50 women and teenage girls entered Großmann's apartment and survived. The first surviving victim to identify herself, Gertrud Haag, appeared on her own on 22 August, saying she had been drugged with tranquilisers and raped during her stay. The ones who were identified were most often raped, but some stated that they either performed regular housekeeping or engaged in consensual intercourse in return for money and habitation. Many stated that Großmann had given them food, coffee, money, or paid for other expenses upon their first meeting. This was observed by long-time sex workers in the borough, who had given him the nickname "Mysterious Karl", as they did not know Großmann's intentions, avoiding him as a client and telling newcomers to decline his alms. The survivors of the rapes described being tied to the bed and tortured by Großmann, which was consistent with the wounds found on several of the dismembered bodies. The earliest identified survivor was Marie Felz, who met Großmann on 1 January 1918. An unemployed 25-year-old feedlot worker, she stated that she was not assaulted by Großmann and had left his home without issue after drinking beer with him and being given a new pair of shoes.

According to true crime writer Colin Wilson, a victim killed on 13 August 1920 was rumoured to be Grand Duchess Anastasia Nikolaevna of Russia, amidst since-discredited rumours of Anastasia's survival of the 1918 executions of the Romanov family. Wilson wrote that a family in Bütow later claimed that the victim was actually their daughter, who had left her home in Pomerania to masquerade as one of several Anastasia impostors. Wilson named her "Franziska Schamzkovski", referring to well-known Anastasia impostor Anna Anderson, whose original name was Franziska Schanzkowski, from Borrowilaß, also in Pomerania; Anderson was in a Berlin mental asylum at the time of the killings and died of natural causes in 1984.

=== Jail stay and confessions ===
Großmann was connected to three murders and suspected of a fourth, tentatively identified as 19-year-old sex worker Emma Baumann from Mecklenburg, based on descriptions from her family provided to local media, although not ascertained by police. During his arrest and two weeks into custody, he would firmly contest that he had killed Nitsche because she had stolen from him, and attempted to convince officers to downgrade his murder charge to manslaughter. It was found that Nitsche, an unemployed cook, did have 100-mark bills on her person, but it is unknown whether they were hers or Großmann's, nor if she really stole them or if they were planted on Nitsche. Großmann stopped his daily pleas when police collected and interviewed several surviving women who described the interior of Großmann's home.

Großmann eventually confessed to several murders after detective Ludwig Werneburg offered to give him access to Hänschen, the pet siskin that he kept in the apartment. Werneburg was further able to gain Großmann's trust by allowing him unhandcuffed private time with the bird. After Werneburg ingratiated himself to Großmann by treating Hänschen for mites, Großmann admitted to killing three women, Marie Nitsche, "Martha", and Johanna Sosnowski. When asked if they had stolen from him, Großmann responded in the negative and said that "in the end, it was all just because I can't control myself around a girl". In the following six hours, Großmann described how he had lured, raped, killed, dismembered, and dumped two of the victims. When asked if he had killed anyone else, Großmann denied having done so and refused to speak further about his crimes, saying they were even for Hänschen's treatment.

The following day, Großmann asked for an attorney, specifically requesting defense counsel Erich Frey, who had become known for his unwavering, if ultimately unsuccessful legal defense of serial killer Friedrich Schumann. Upon their first meeting under police supervision in September, the first thing Großmann asked of Frey was for him to take possession of his bird. That same day, Großmann confessed to the murder of Frieda Schubert, after investigators confronted him with Schubert's purse found on his property. On 15 September, he told police of the murder committed in summer 1921, as well as the murder of Albertine Asche during the same timeframe. However, Großmann returned to his initial explanation that he killed the women accidentally in angry outbursts, though even then his reasoning included justifications such as refusal to sleep with him or failure to disclose a steady partner. On 24 September, he was officially charged in Charlottenburg court with the murders of Nitsche, Sosnowski, and Asche; the murder of "Martha" was not pursued since she could not be identified at the time and her proper name was only discovered after Großmann's trial. During the hearing, Großmann insisted to prosecutor Siegfried Lindow that he should be ruled criminally insane to avoid the death penalty and later wrote a complaint that the victims had consented to sex, were never choked by him, that deaths were accidental while he was "caressing their tongues" and that testimony of survivors was "partly heavily exaggerated or wholly untrue".

During his time in jail, Großmann attacked and attempted to strangle a guard, after which he was chained during meetings with his lawyer. By June 1922, Großmann had reportedly begun writing an autobiography in which he claimed that he killed his victims because they were "surplus women", whom he described as "economic and social pests". English-language media referred to Großmann as a Bluebeard and dubbed him a "German Jack the Ripper" or "German Landru", despite also acknowledging that none of the murderers shared much similarity in modus operandi besides killing women. The same newspapers misrepresented the victims as being exclusively prostitutes who were lured by the promise of money or legitimate work.

A medical assessment by Medizinalrat Robert Störmer, who also personally met with the arrestee, examined Großmann's familial history, including that of his father's previous wives, their husbands, and their children. His younger brother, Wilhelm Großmann, was treated at two Weißensee asylums for "cerebral softening" before dying at Martin Gropius Krankenhaus in 1911 at age 39, but this was believed to have stemmed from a severe head injury incurred at work and an untreated syphilis infection. One of Wilhelm's four children was judged to be "feeble-minded". A half-brother, August Schulz, who was a Gefreiter in the Prussian Army, had been imprisoned for 15 years for the rape of a domestic servant and, after being released, also raped a child. Schulz died around 1907 during his second 15-year sentence. A niece and nephew of Großmann, related through a maternal half-sister, were described as suffering from "screaming fits while sleeping" and "recurrent fits of rage", but otherwise sane. Though both of Großmann's parents were deceased by 1911, no greater history of mental illness could be found in his extended maternal family, though there was no available information about his paternal lineage before the elder Karl Großmann.

=== Trial and death ===
Großmann's trial began on 3 July 1922 at Moabit Criminal Court. Court witnesses included Großmann's neighbours and colleagues, as well as over a dozen survivors chosen to testify, the latter of whom made several attempts to assault Großmann. An eyewitness hurled a set of keys at Großmann, which nearly hit his court-appointed defense counsel, while a surviving victim lunged at Großmann for accusing her and other witnesses of lying. Others cried on the stand. Großmann had retracted his initial confession and now repeated his claim that he only killed his victims because they stole from him, accusing the witnesses of telling "pure lies" and being "ungrateful to [his] hospitality".

On the third day of the main trial, judicial officers found Großmann dead in his cell at Justizvollzugsanstalt Moabit when they came to transport him to court. Großmann had used his bedsheet as a makeshift noose and hanged himself by tying it to a loose nail in the door frame. A bailiff left a written note on the desk of the presiding judge, Walter Böhmert. Großmann's attorney recalled that Böhmert read the note, sighed, put on his hat, and rose to deliver the following announcement:

The defendant Carl Großmann will not appear at today's hearing. He ended his life in his cell earlier this morning. Regarding the circumstances that have led to this, an investigation is underway. This defendant, who showed no sign of remorse in this court, has turned himself in to a higher judge. He has spared the appointed jury the choice of putting an end to this unusual criminal. The proceedings are closed.

A death mask was cast of Großmann's head and kept in police custody, but it is presumed to have been destroyed during the bombing of Berlin in World War II.

== Media ==
- Director Fritz Lang, in an interview about his film M, stated that "At the time I decided to use the subject matter of M, there were many serial killers terrorizing Germany—Haarmann, Großmann, Kürten, Denke, [...]".
- The song "Neuruppin" by the hip hop group K.I.Z refers to the Großmann case. K.I.Z claim to not have known about these parallels between the lyrics and Großmann's crimes.
- The song "The Sweet Tender Meat Vendor" by Macabre is about Großmann.

== See also ==
- Fritz Haarmann
- Karl Denke
- List of German serial killers

== Bibliography ==
- Matthias Blazek (2009), Carl Großmann und Friedrich Schumann – Zwei Serienmörder in den zwanziger Jahren, Ibidem-Verlag, Stuttgart, ISBN 978-3-8382-0027-9.
- Horst Bosetzky (2004), Die Bestie vom Schlesischen Bahnhof, Jaron-Verlag, Berlin, ISBN 3-89773-078-2.
- Peter Haining (2005), Cannibal Killers: Murderers Who Kill and Eat Their Victims, chapter: "The Bread And Butter Brides", Magpie Books, UK, ISBN 978-1-84529-792-3.
- Masters, R.E.L.; Lea, Eduard; Edwardes, Allen, (1963), Perverse Crimes in History: Evolving Concepts of Sadism, Lust-Murder, and Necrophilia from Ancient to Modern Times, New York: Julian Press.
- Maria Tatar (1995), Lustmord: Sexual Murder in Weimar Germany, Princeton, NJ (English), ISBN 0-691-01590-2.
