= Heino Schmieden =

German architect

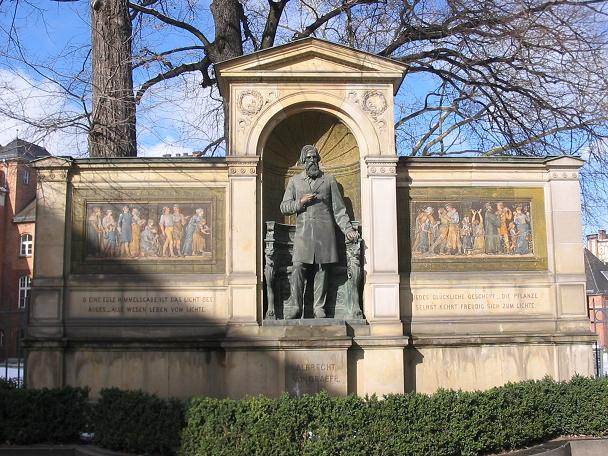
Albrecht von Graefe Memorial in Berlin

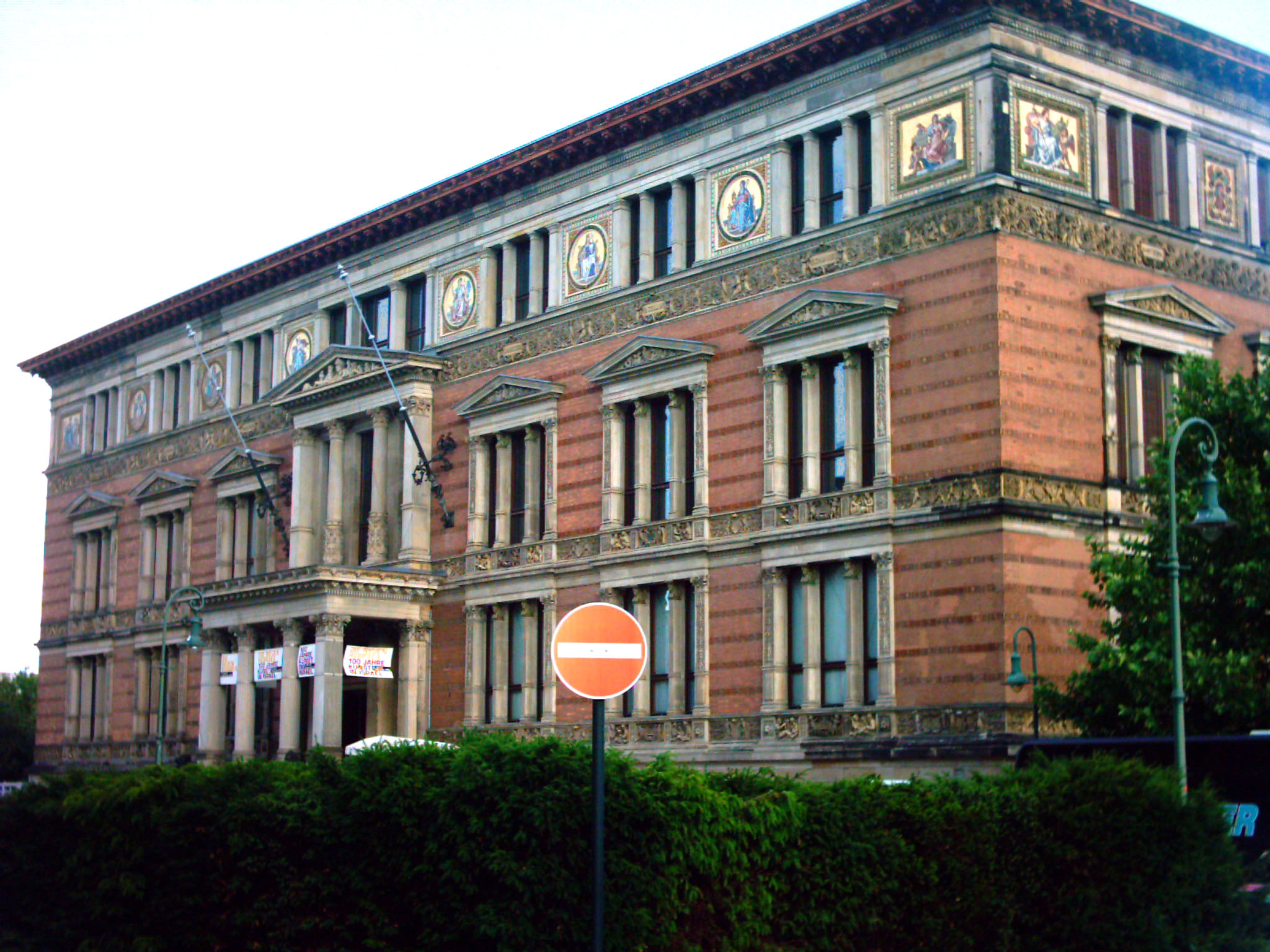
Martin Gropius Bau in Berlin

Heino Schmieden (May 15, 1835 – September 7, 1913) was a German architect.

== Biography ==
Schmieden was born in Soldin, New March (modern Myślibórz, Poland) In 1866 Schmieden graduated from the renowned Bauakademie in Berlin with a diploma in architecture. Even during his last year at the school he had been continuing his studies with trips to France, England and Italy.

With high artistic aspirations he produced plans for museums, hospitals, monuments and villas in addition to conceiving numerous residence and office buildings. Until Martin Gropius' death in 1880, he and Schmieden worked together to develop their architecture firm, Fa. Gropius & Schmieden, into one of Berlin's greatest. The firm continued to produce great work thereafter as Schmieden teamed up with such notable architects as Robert Speer, Victor von Weltzien and Julius Boethke to run it.

The present-day Martin Gropius Bau in Berlin was built in 1881 based on plans by Schmieden and Martin Gropius as an applied art museum. It was constructed in the style of the Italian Renaissance and has a central atrium. Mosaics with allegories from various ages and the coats of arms of German states decorate the spaces between windows.

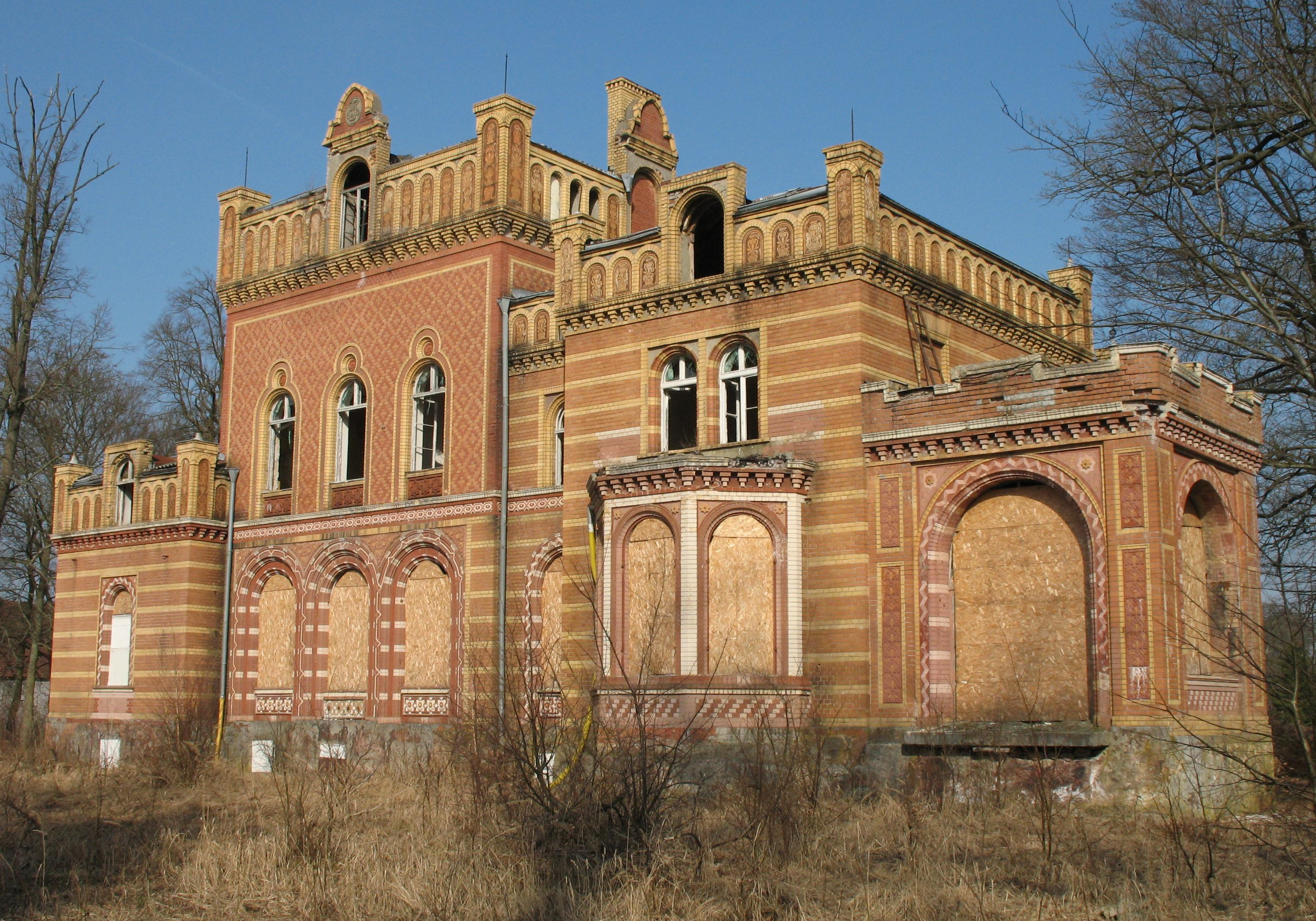
Manor in Neuruppin-Gentzrode

In 1881 he became a member of the Berlin Bauakademie, followed by his admittance in 1887 to the Prussian Academy of Arts.

He is buried in the Alter St. Matthäus Kirchhof in the Schöneberg neighborhood of Berlin.
