= Prussian Eastern Railway Headquarters =

Building in Bydgoszcz, Poland

- Polish: Budynek Dyrekcji Kolei w Bydgoszczy
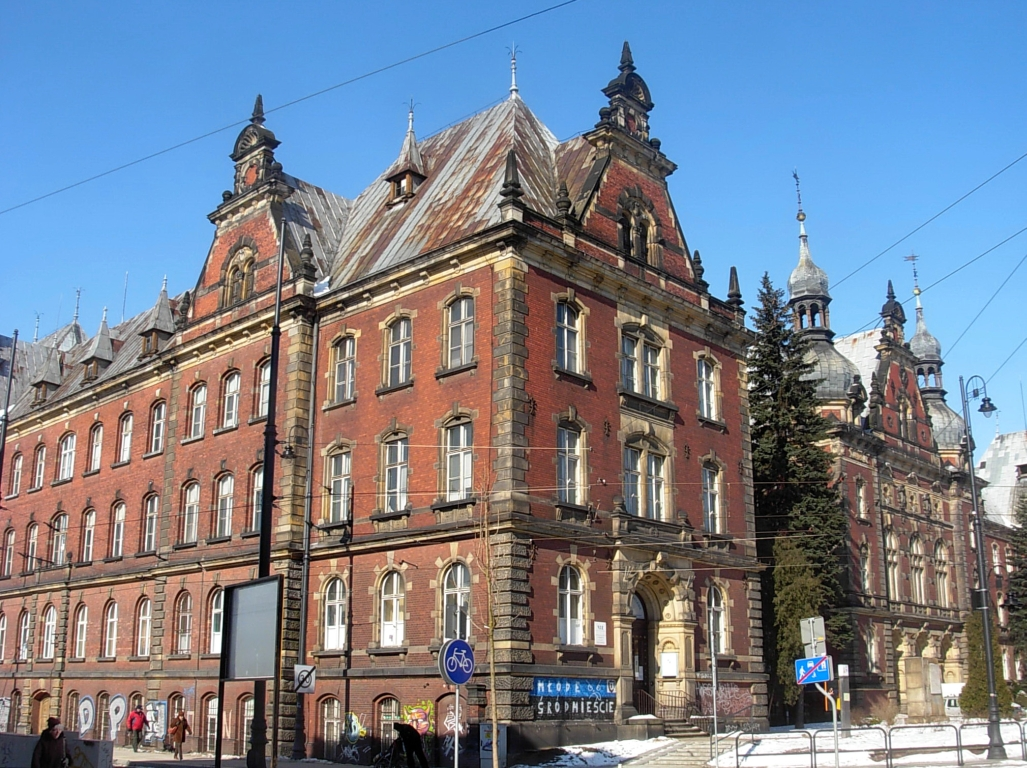
- Former Prussian Eastern Railway headquarters
- Interactive map of the Prussian Eastern Railway Headquarters area
- Alternative names: Pomeranian Rail agency and Central Bureau of Foreign Settlements (1922–1939), Seat of French-Polish Rail Association (1937–1939)

General information
- Architectural style: Dutch Mannerism
- Classification: Nr.601288-Reg.A/748, 10th Dec. 1971
- Location: 63 Dworcowa street, Bydgoszcz, Poland
- Coordinates: 53°7′49″N 17°59′44″E
- Current tenants: Polish State Railways
- Construction started: 1886
- Completed: 1889
- Client: Royal (Prussian) Directorate of Eastern Railway

Technical details
- Floor count: 4

Design and construction
- Architects: Martin Gropius, Heino Schmieden

The Prussian Eastern Railway Headquarters is a historical building in Bydgoszcz, Poland. It is the former headquarters of the Prussian Eastern Railway. It is registered on the Kuyavian-Pomeranian Voivodeship Heritage List of Poland.

== Location ==
The building is located at 63 Dworcowa Street, in downtown Bydgoszcz, on the embankment of to Brda river, approx. 300 metres from the main railway station. Until 1919, its address was Bahnhofstrasse 28, Bromberg.

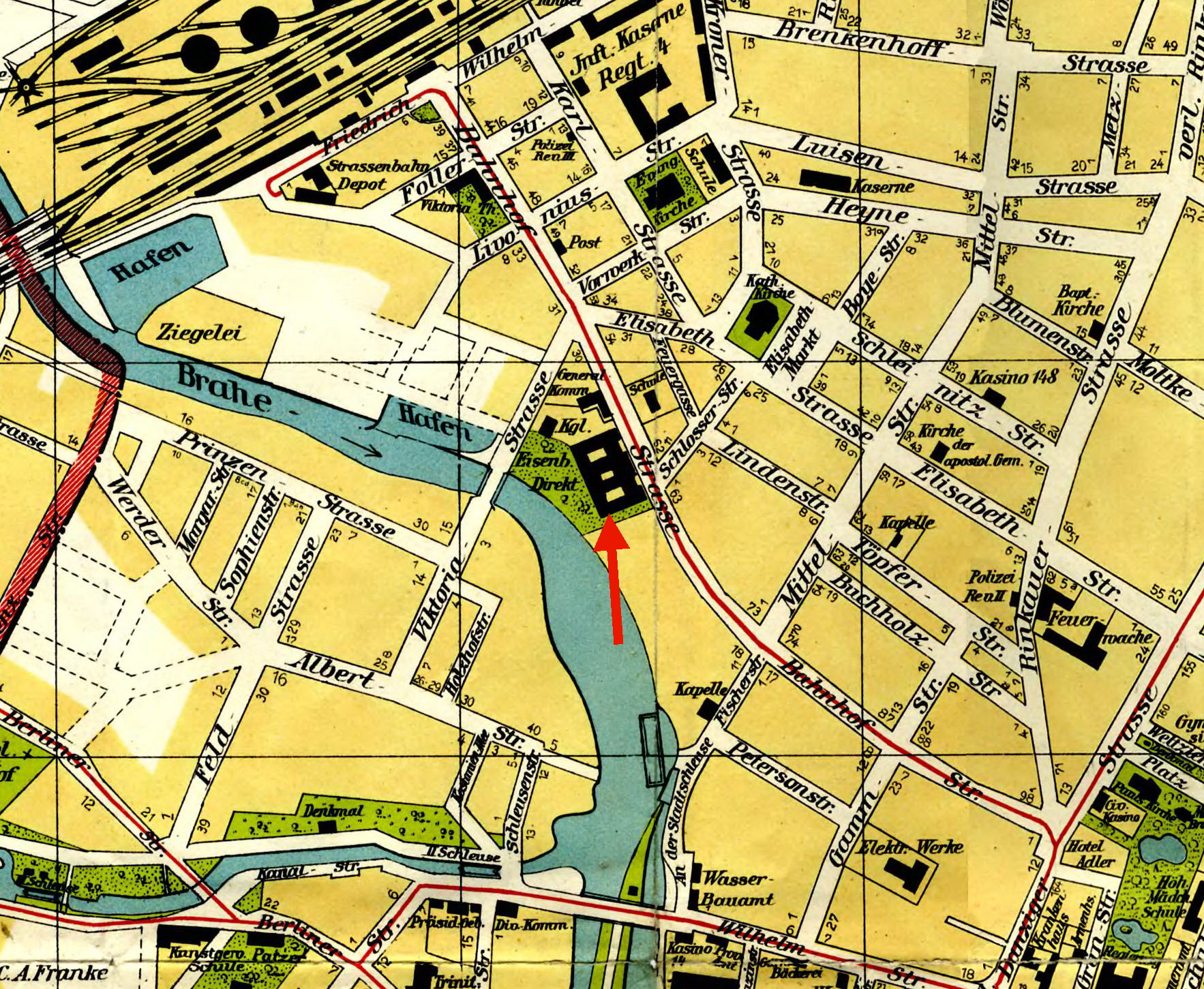
Building on a German map of 1914

== History ==
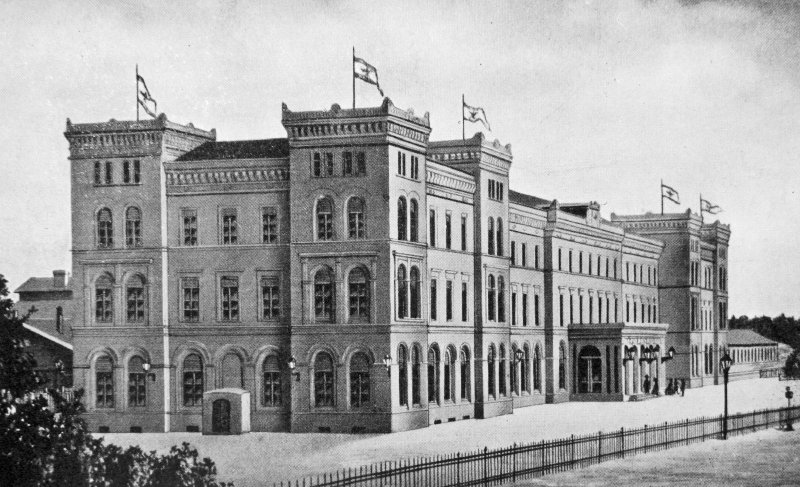
Bromberg railway station in 1890, soon after completion

=== Project inception ===
The Directorate of Prussian Railways in Bromberg (now Bydgoszcz) was established in 1849 at Neuer Markt (now Nowy Rynek) 8, before moving in 1853 to the main train station building. As its activity expanded with the development of the Prussian Eastern Railway network, and despite the addition of large wings to the station in 1861, the edifice was almost entirely devoted to administrative purposes. The old station proved to be too narrow, and some departments had to be transferred to nearby rented houses (11 houses were rented in 1880).

It soon became necessary to construct a new building. The architectural company for this project was chaired by Berlin architect Martin Gropius and economist Heino Schmieden.

Philipp Martin Gropius, designer of the building, was a disciple of architects Schinkel and Beuth from Gewerbeinstitut Berlin. In 1855 he graduated from Bauakademie (Academy of Architecture) in Berlin, in 1862 he took the position of Landbaumeister (domestic architect) in the Berlin Police Construction agency. In 1869 he became director of the Royal School of Arts and Crafts in Berlin.

The plan for a new building had been submitted in 1885 to the Prussian Assembly (Landtag). Initial costs were estimated at 2.5 million marks, considered too high by the Prussian Ministry of Public Works, and a more modest plant was developed, designed by Prussian National Building Inspector Bergmann Dahms. He chose a site at Bahnhofstrasse 28 (now ul. Dworcowa 63), near the main station.

=== Construction ===
Construction started in summer 1886 and ended middle of 1888. Dahms managed the project, except for the sewer and central heating installations. The interior employed rich architectural ornamentation emphasizing the importance of the station, a four-story building with two wings. Shortly after completion, a smaller edifice with outbuildings, including garages and a high-stack boiler room, was erected on a neighboring street. The scheme of the project (both facade displays and interiors) had to reflect the imposing appearance of official Prussian buildings of the era. In this case, it exhibited aspects of the Mannerist style.

=== Follow-up ===
The building remained the seat of the East Prussian Railways until Bromberg, renamed Bydgoszcz, became part of the refounded Polish state in August 1919. The new state administration created a Ministry of Railways in Warsaw, which appointed seven Directions of District State Railways, where Bydgoszcz was subordinated to the administration of DOKP in Danzig (now Gdańsk), newly created as a "free city" under League of Nations supervision. Consequently, Bydgoszcz's building moved under the control of Department of Revenue, and in 1922 it housed an Office station. A year later, a medical Railway Clinic was set up there. After several changes of ownership, the Ministry of Communications moved a part of the Danzig headquarters back to the Dworcowa edifice (1 October 1933). At the same time, it housed the Central Bureau of Foreign logistics. (Polish: Centralne Biuro Rozrachunków Zagranicznych) of the PKP. In 1937, the building also housed the French-Polish Rail Association, a joint-stock company formed after the construction of the Coal Trunk-Line from the Upper Silesian Coal Basin to the Baltic Sea port of Gdynia.

After the German occupation of World War II, building ownership moved to the National Treasury and passed back to Rail Administration in 1970. Since 1990 a large part of the premises is leased to numerous private and public companies. In October 2013 the building was handed to CM UMK, in order to install their dentistry faculty. Necessary renovations to adapt the building to the needs of the institution and its equipment will cost about 30 million zł.

== Architecture ==
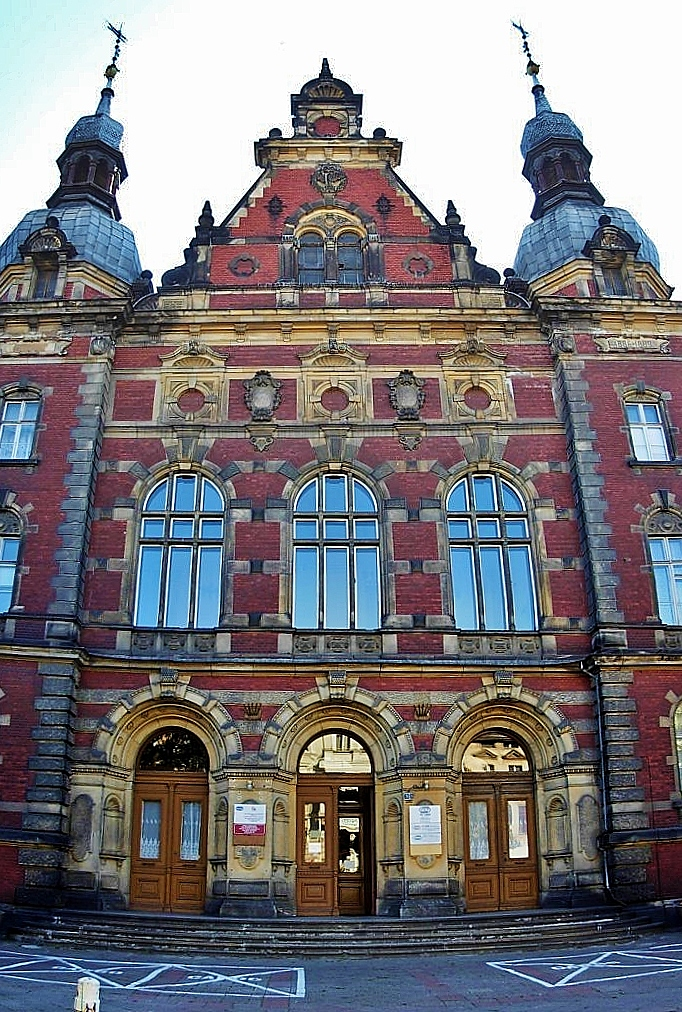
Main entrance

The building is built in a reminiscing Dutch Mannerism, with a tower and decorative gables. In Bydgoszcz, such a style can be noticed similarly on a building at 9 Kołłątaja Street (former shelter for blind people) and on the Lloyd's Palace building at Grodzka St.17.

Dworcowa edifice has been built on a rectangular plan, with 3 courtyards in the middle of the building. Building body is covered with high gable roofs and 2 avant-corps front Towers topped with domes. The front elevation has highly detailed stone decoration, especially the main front gate facade.

The main building material is brick, combined with cement-lime mortar and outside ornaments use red brick veneer. External walls have friezes enhanced with yellow and green clinker glazed brick. Other techniques include Bossage corners, cornices, portals, and doorjambs made of carved sandstone.

Building entrances are through side or main avant-corps of the elevation: each of them is adorned with ornate portal.

The original window frames are still preserved with different forms, most decorative windows -passing through two floors- are dedicated to the main meeting room. All parts of the building are topped with gables and the two tall towers flanking the facade have tented roof with octagonal lanterns.

Roofs, supported by a wooden structure, were originally covered with English tiles, now replaced by galvanized steel sheets. Several dormers pop out of the roof.

In the vicinity, at Krolowej Jadwigi street, is located another edifice, replicating dutch Mannerism style of main building. In the renovation process, it lost its steep roofs and gables.

After building completion in 1889, the following areas were in use:

- In the basement – two apartments for ushers, branch prints and branch control;
- On the ground floor – a safe home, the technical division, and the tariff policy office;
- On the first floor – HR department, secretariat, a library, the traffic control;
- On the second floor – planning office, technical, statistical and material offices.

In the middle of the building, on the first floor, above the entrance hall was a representative conference room with 3 large windows.

Today, building interior only partially reflects its original character. Best preserved are:

- A three-span system hall;
- Cross vaults corridors;
- THe ceremonial staircase with windows filled with etched glass coats of arms motifs of cities (Gdańsk, Poznań).

Representative conference room still retains large ornate panelling extending to a height of approx. 2 m, topped with ornate cornices. The hall leads to a massive portal including motifs corbel and herma.

The building was registered on the Kuyavian-Pomeranian Voivodeship Heritage List Nr.601288 Reg.A/748, on 10 December 1971.

Four plane trees are registered as Polish natural monuments: they stand along the Brda river, and have tree circumferences measured between 337 cm and 445 cm.

== Gallery ==
=== Outdoors ===
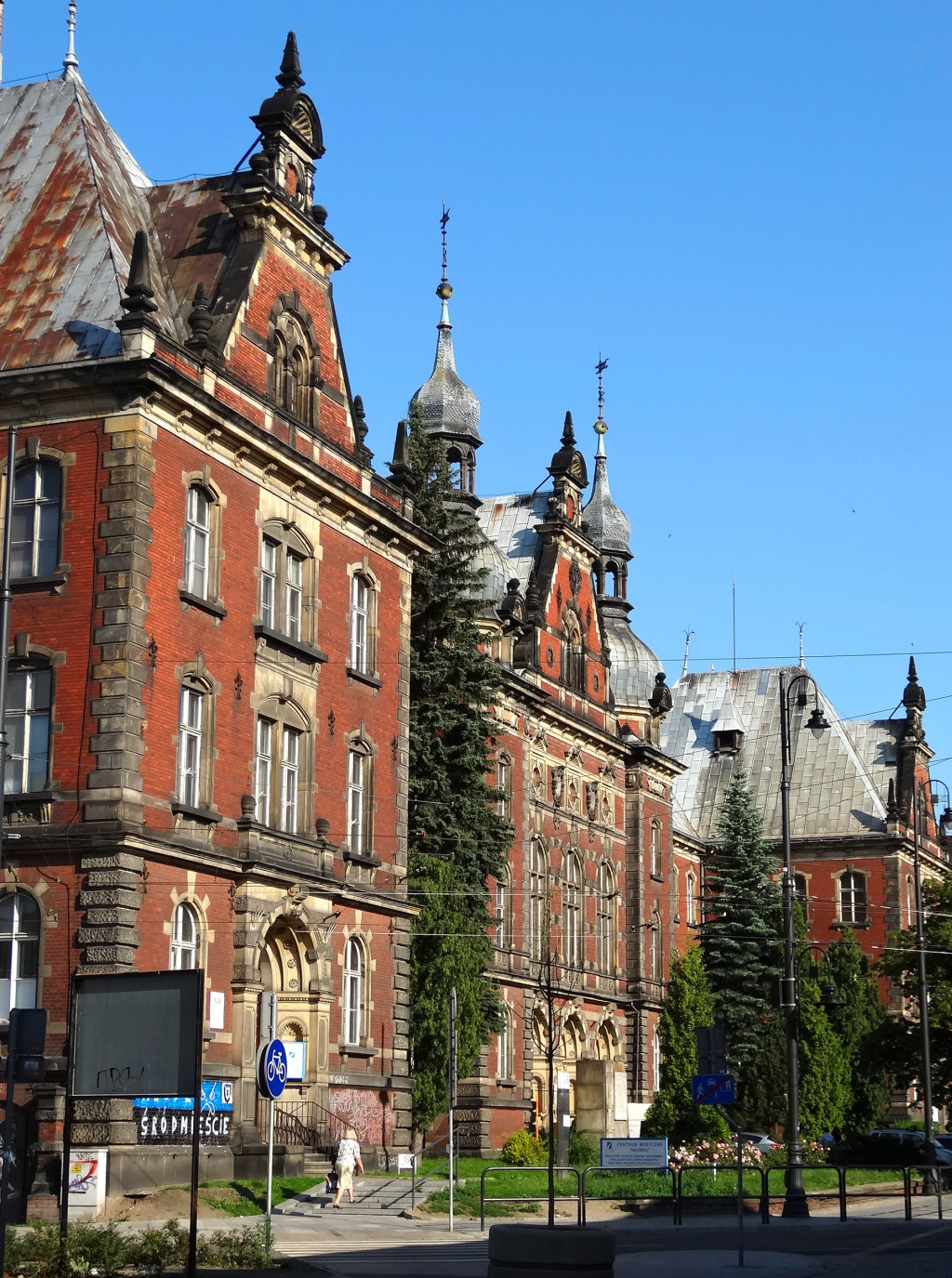
View with 3 entry gates onto Dworcowa st.

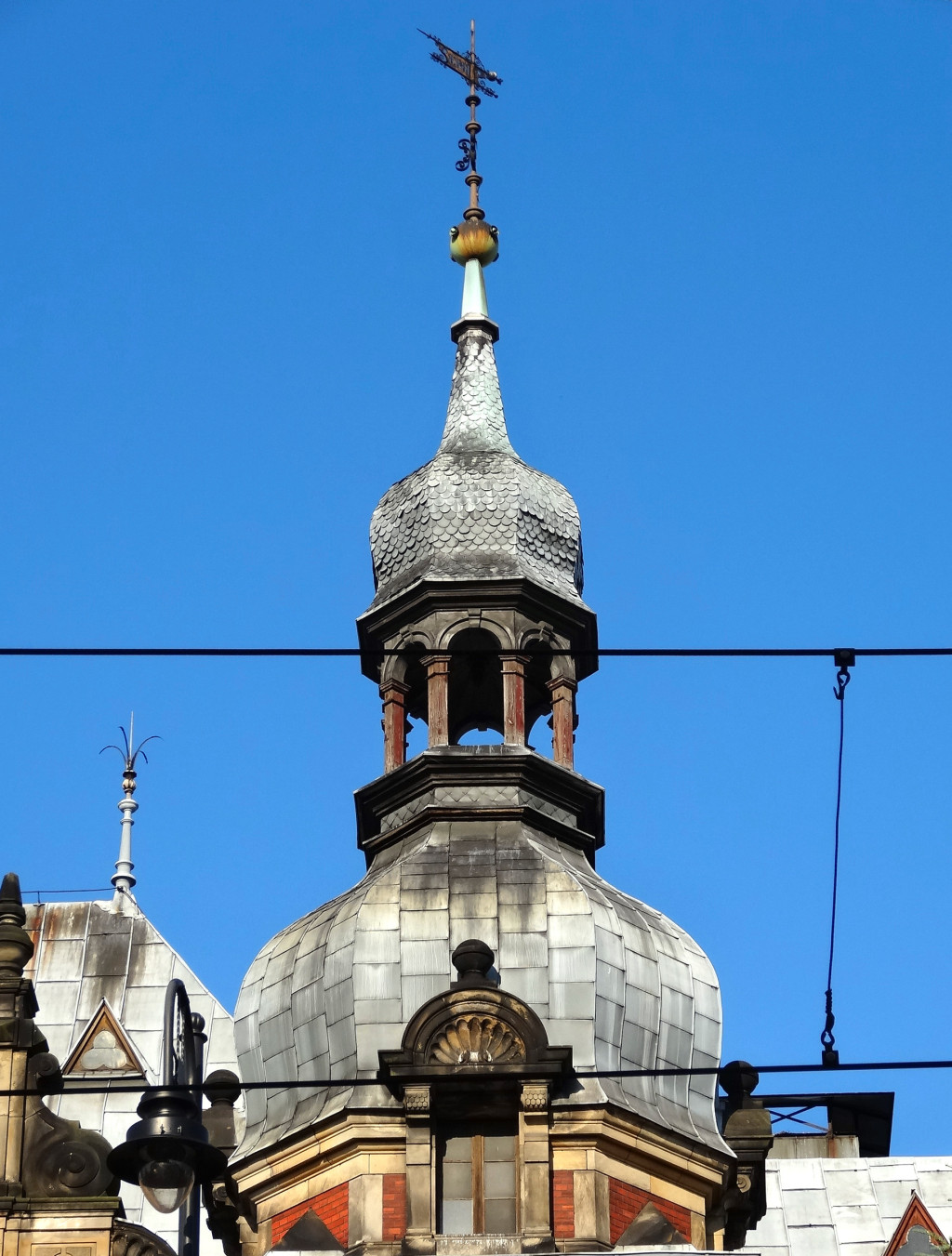
Roof lantern

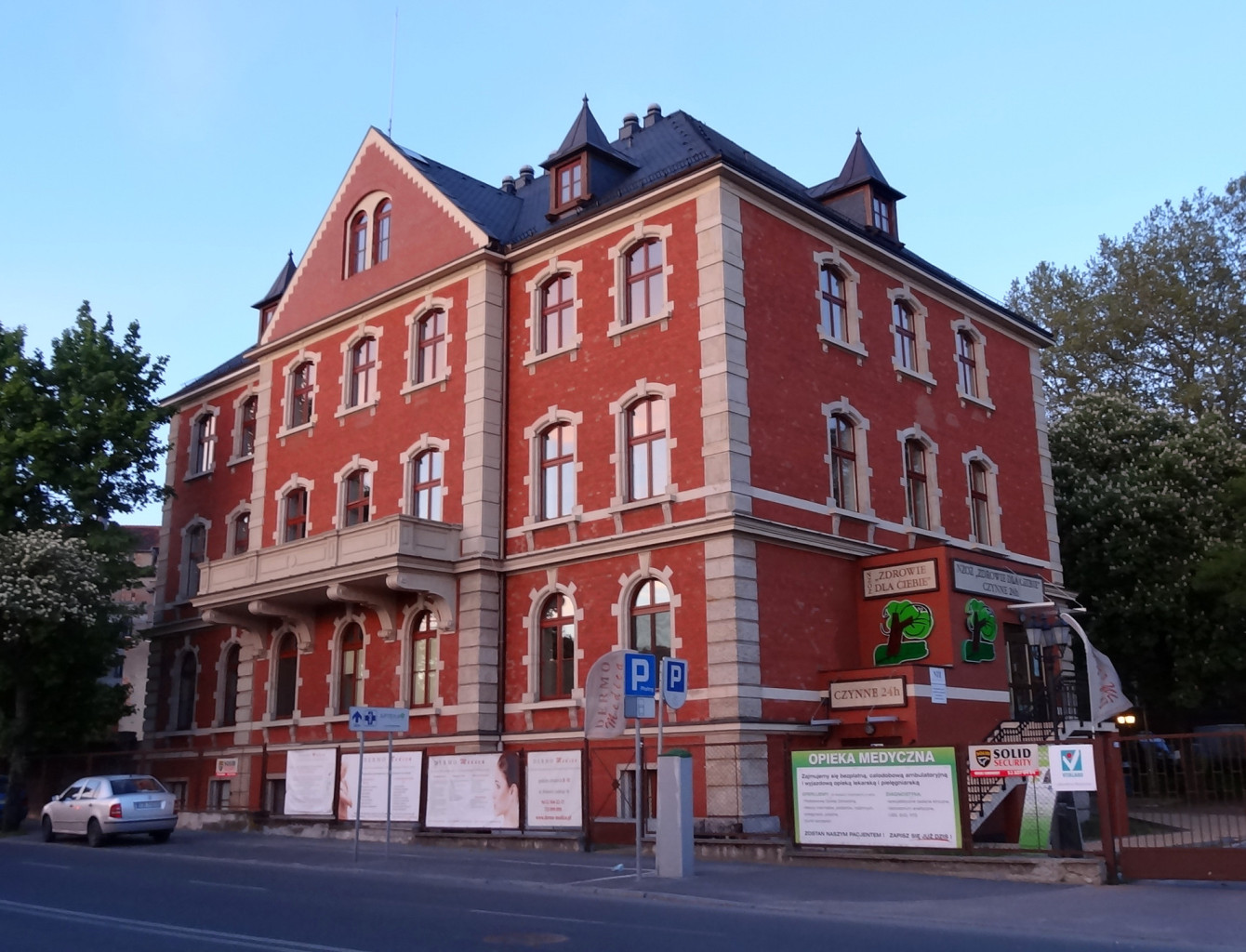
Renovated adjacent building

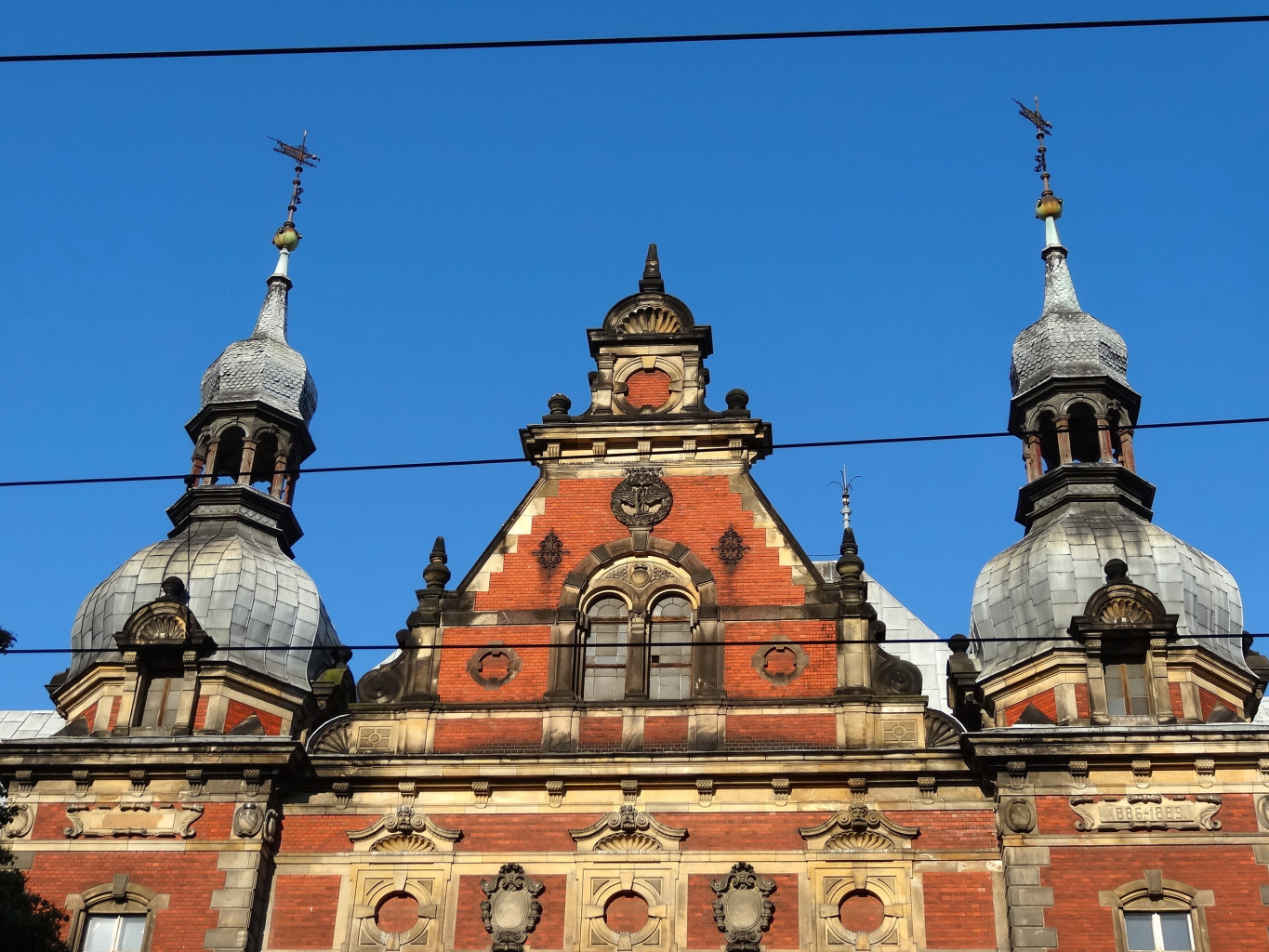
Detail of main gate gable

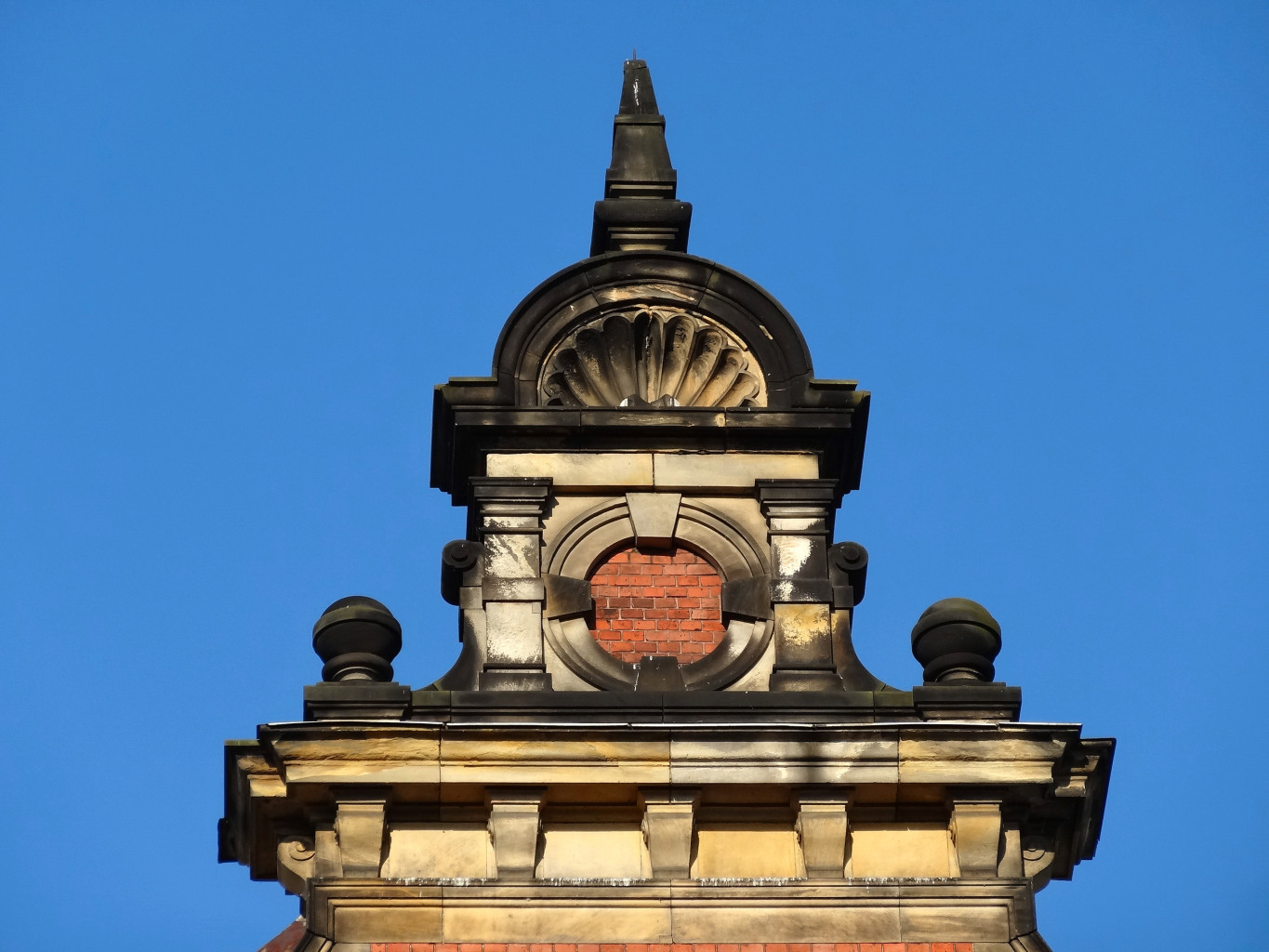
Peak of a side entrance

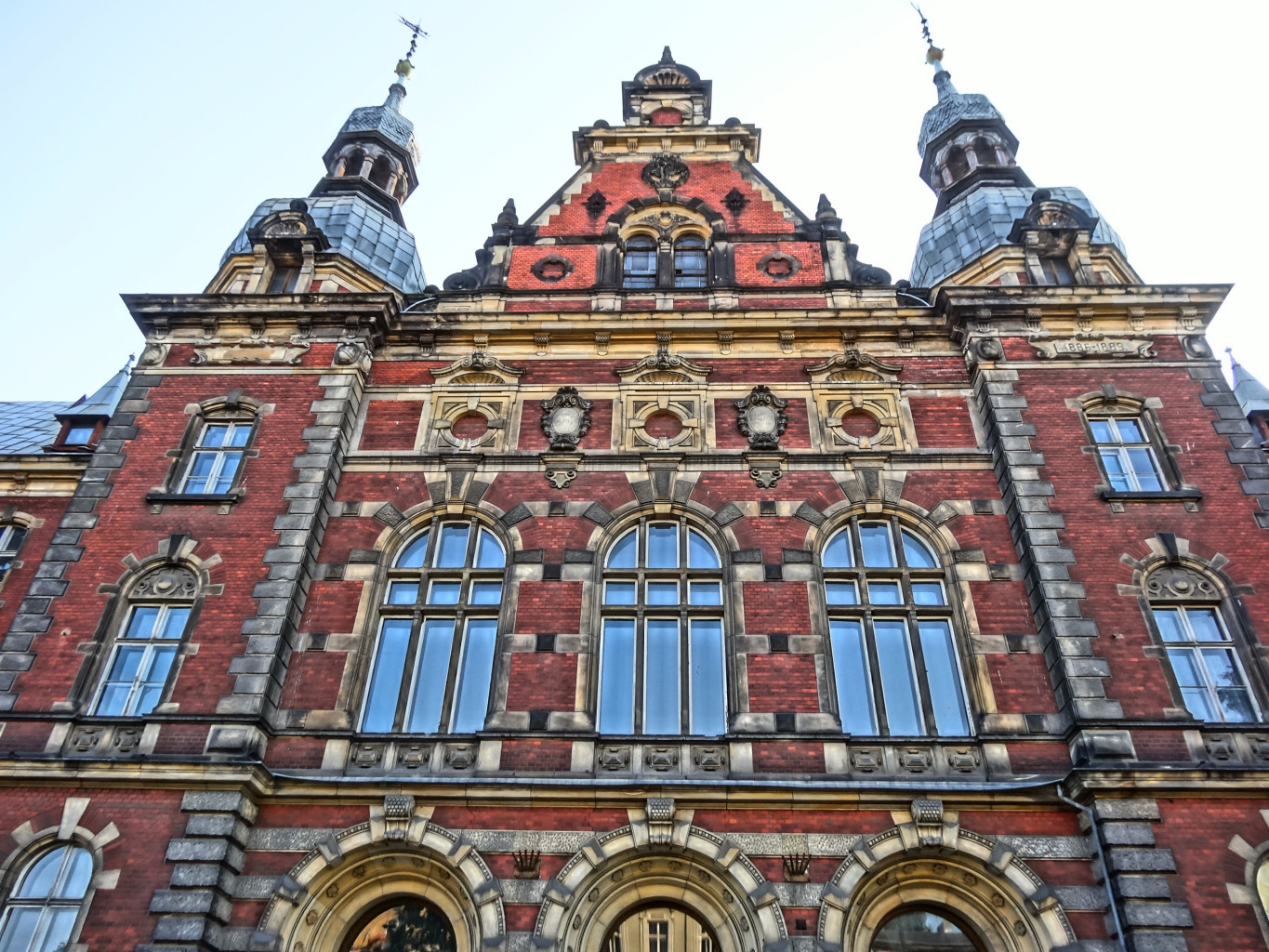
Detail of main facade, with conference room large windows

=== Indoors ===
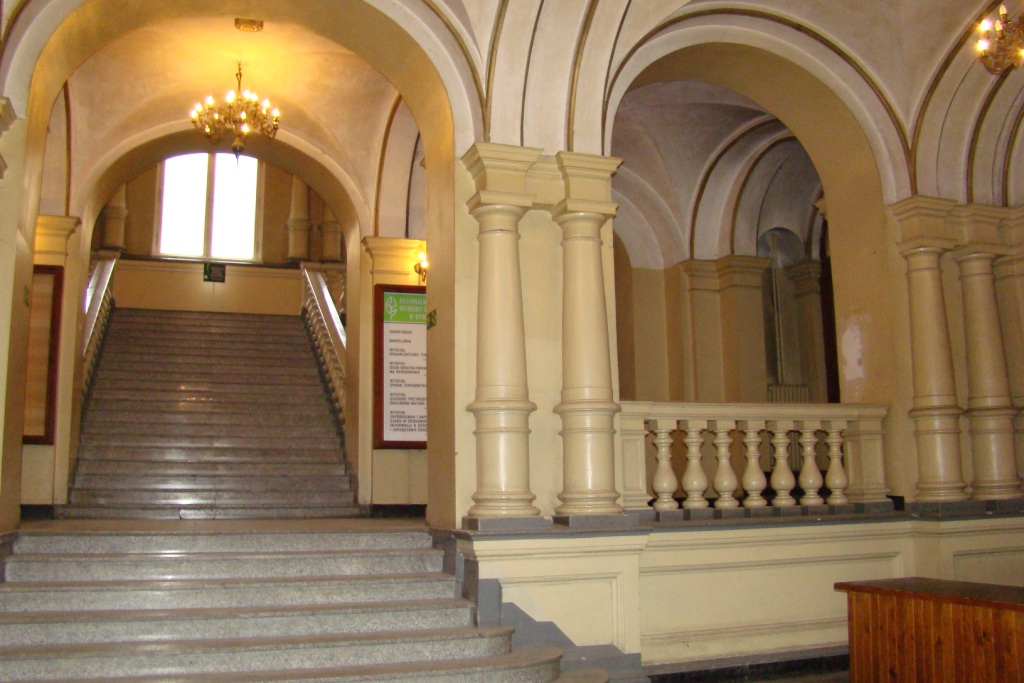
Entrance hall

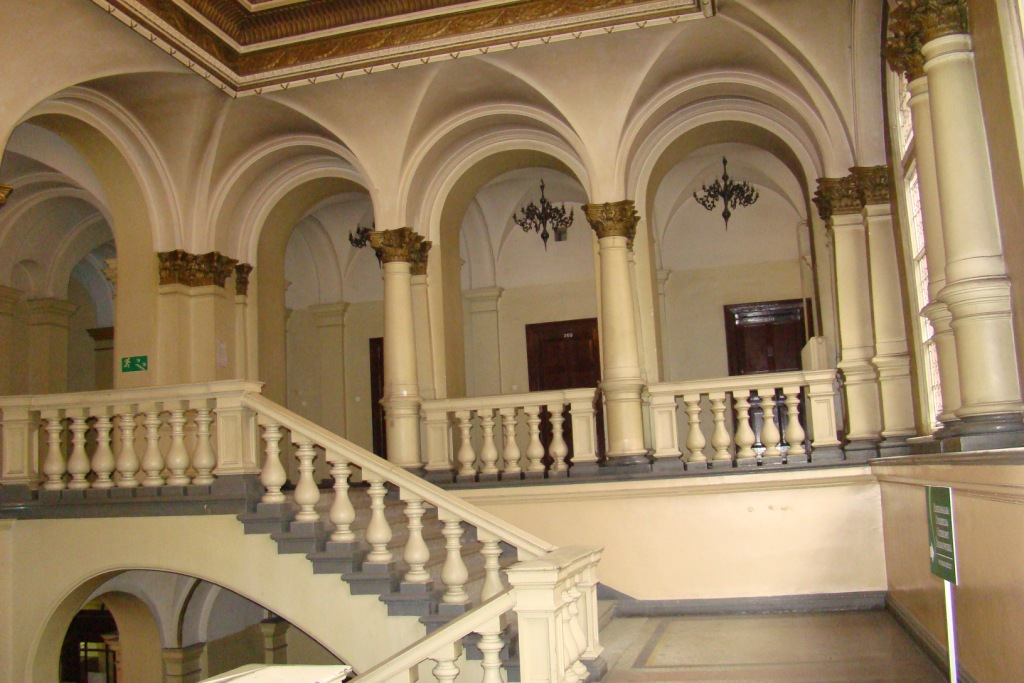
Landing of main stairs

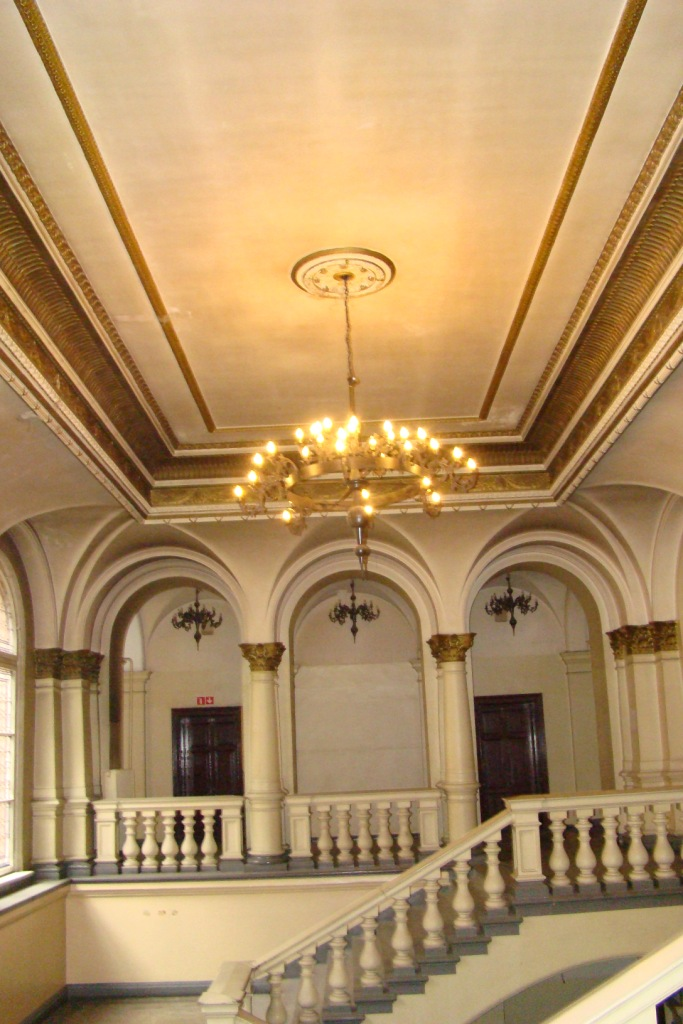
Ornate main hall ceiling

== See also ==
- Prussian state railways

== Bibliography ==
- (in Polish) Jastrzębska-Puzowska Iwona, Winter Piotr: Budynek dawnej Dyrekcji Kolei Wschodniej w Bydgoszczy, [w:] Materiały do dziejów kultury i sztuki Bydgoszczy i regionu\, Zeszyt 1, Bydgoszcz 1996
- (in Polish) Mierzyński, Jan: 125 rocznica powstania dyrekcji kolejowej w Bydgoszczy, Kronika Bydgoska V (1971–73), Bydgoszcz 1980
- Parucka, Krystyna (2008). Zabytki Bydgoszczy – minikatalog (in Polish). Bydgoszcz: Tifen.
