= Martin-Gropius-Bau =

Museum in Berlin

Coordinates: 52°30′23″N 13°22′55″E

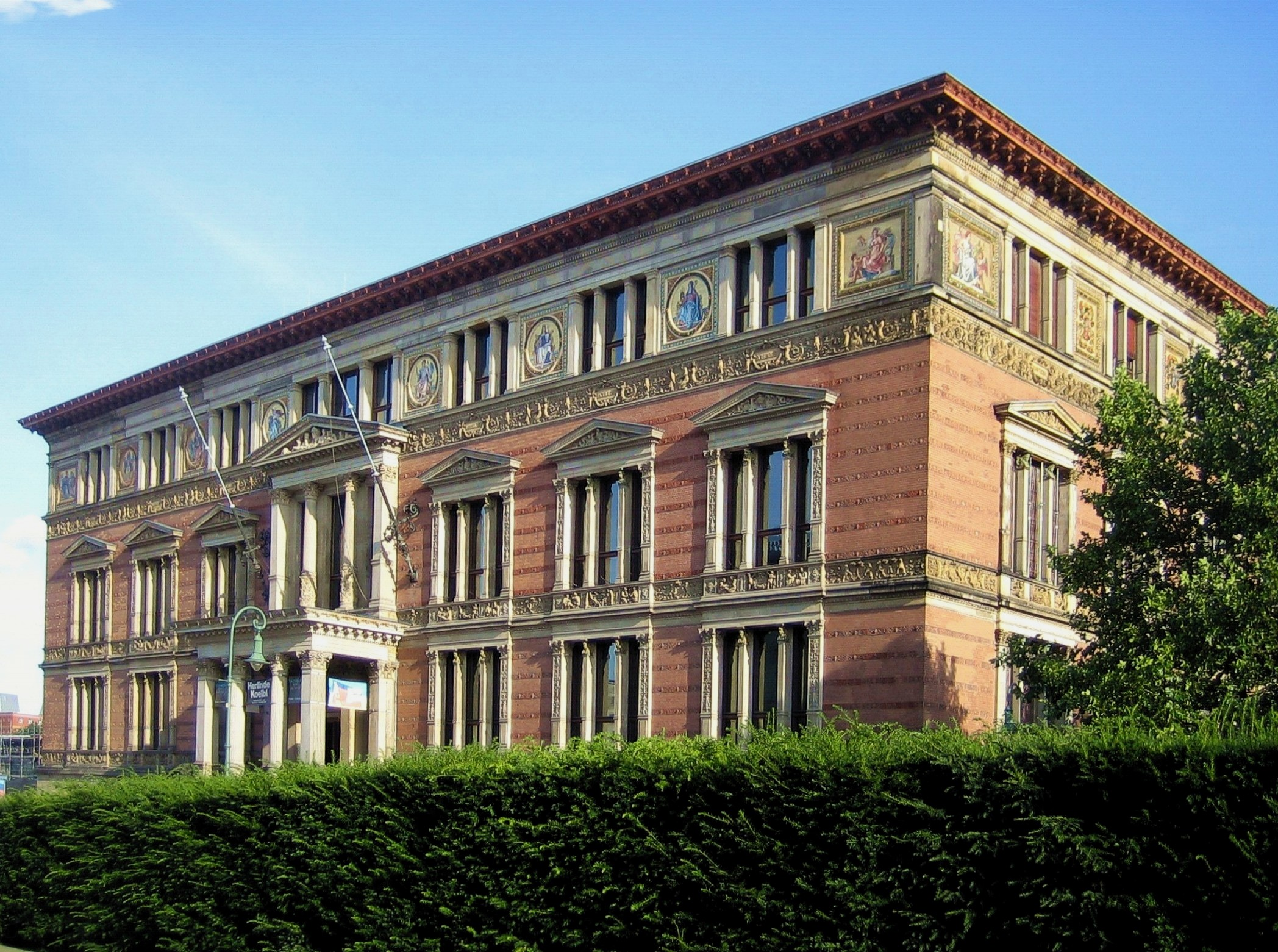
Front view from Niederkirchnerstraße in 2009

Martin-Gropius-Bau, Berlin

Martin-Gropius-Bau, commonly known as Gropius Bau, is an important exhibition space in Berlin, Germany. Originally a museum of applied arts, the building has been a listed historical monument since 1966. It is located at 7 Niederkirchnerstraße in Berlin-Kreuzberg.

== History and architecture ==
The building was erected between 1877 and 1881 by the architects Martin Gropius, a great uncle of Walter Gropius, and Heino Schmieden in the neo-Renaissance style. The building officially opened in 1881. The ground plan is quadratic (length of each side c. 70 m; building height c. 26 m). The exhibition rooms surround an imposing atrium decorated with mosaics and the coats of arms of German states by sculptor Otto Lessing.

Originally designed to house Berlin's Museum of Applied Arts, after World War I the building housed Berlin's Museum for Prehistory and Early History and the East Asian Art Collection. It was severely damaged in 1945 during the last weeks of World War II, and reopened in 1981 after post war reconstruction beginning in 1978. Further renovation took place in 1998/1999 resulting in what is often described as one of Germany's most beautiful historic exhibition buildings.

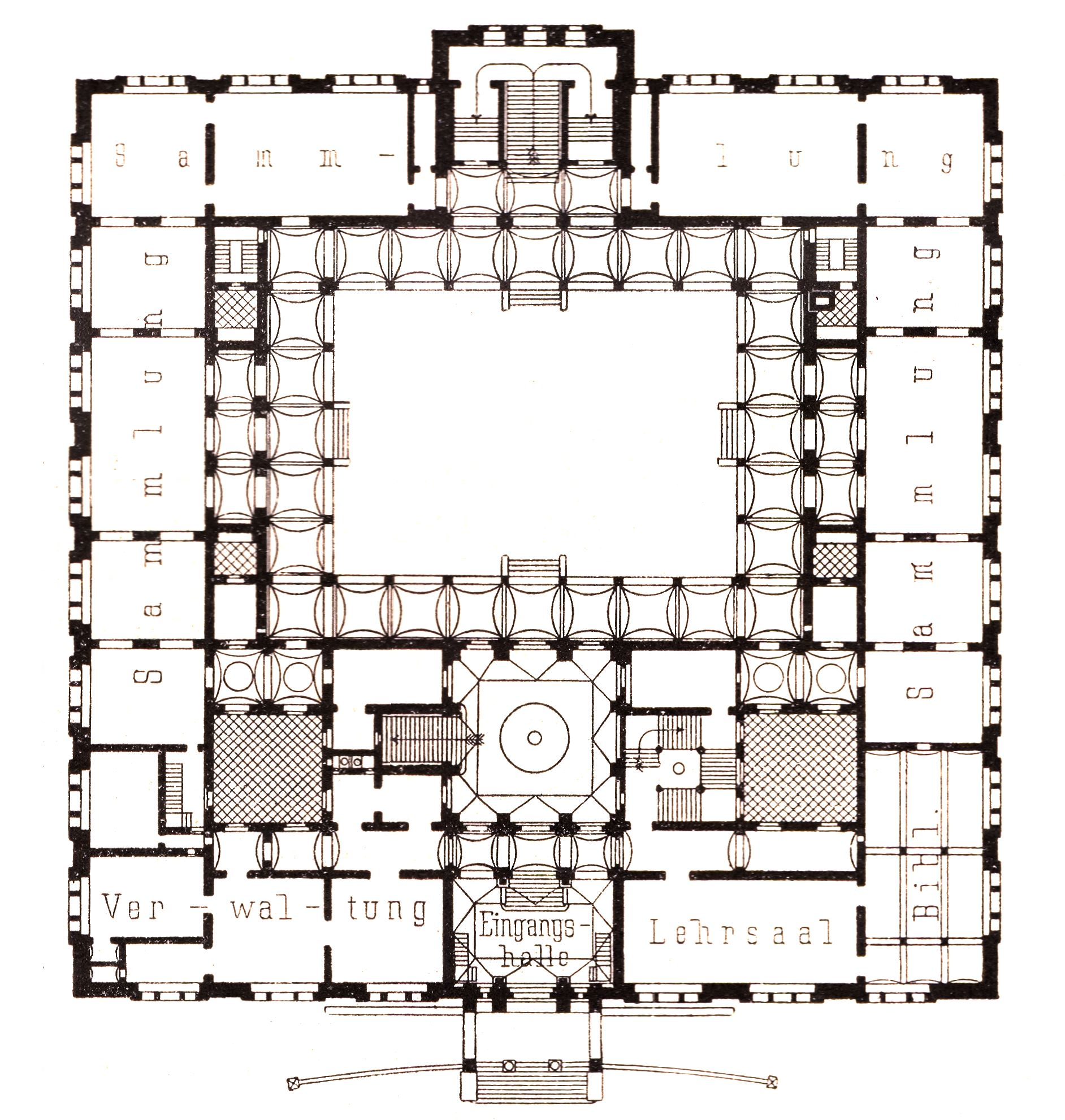
Ground floor

Until German reunification in 1990, the building stood on the border between East and West Berlin, at the boundary of the East Berlin district Mitte.

The Martin-Gropius-Bau has exhibited works by Ai Weiwei, Walker Evans, Anish Kapoor, Johannes Itten and Paul Klee.

== Description ==
The gallery is usually referred to as Gropius Bau.

Its central Berlin location, generous dimensions, and elaborate architectural decorations, not to mention the quality of its temporary exhibitions, have helped it become a major cultural and tourist attraction. Across the street is the Berlin "city and state" parliament building (Abgeordneten Haus), which was originally built in 1899 to house the Prussian parliament. The Third Reich documentation center Topography of Terror is next to the Martin-Gropius-Bau. Potsdamer Platz is about 100 m away.

== Exhibitions ==
- 2013: Anish Kapoor. Kapoor in Berlin
- 2013/2014: Barbara Klemm. Fotografien 1968–2013
- 2014: Ai Weiwei
- 2014: David Bowie
- 2014/2015: The Vikings
- 2015/2016: Germaine Krull – Fotografien
