= Martin Gropius =

German architect (1824–1880)

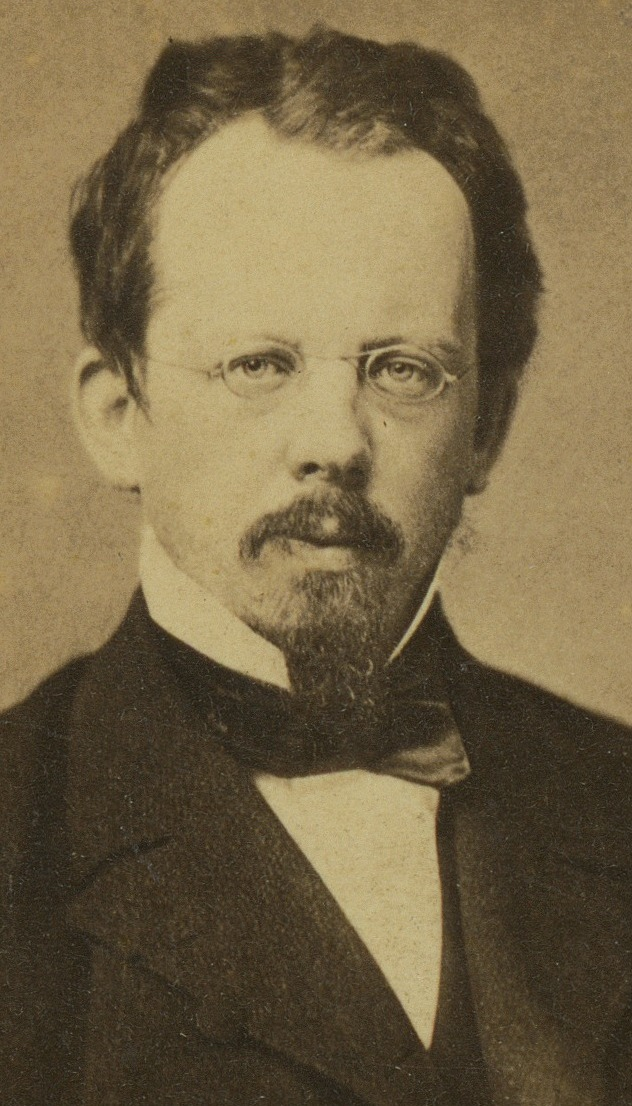
- Martin Gropius
- Born: Martin Carl Philipp Gropius; 11 August 1824; Berlin, Germany
- Died: 13 December 1880 (aged 56)
- Occupation: Architect

Martin Carl Philipp Gropius (11 August 1824, Berlin – 13 December 1880) was a German architect.

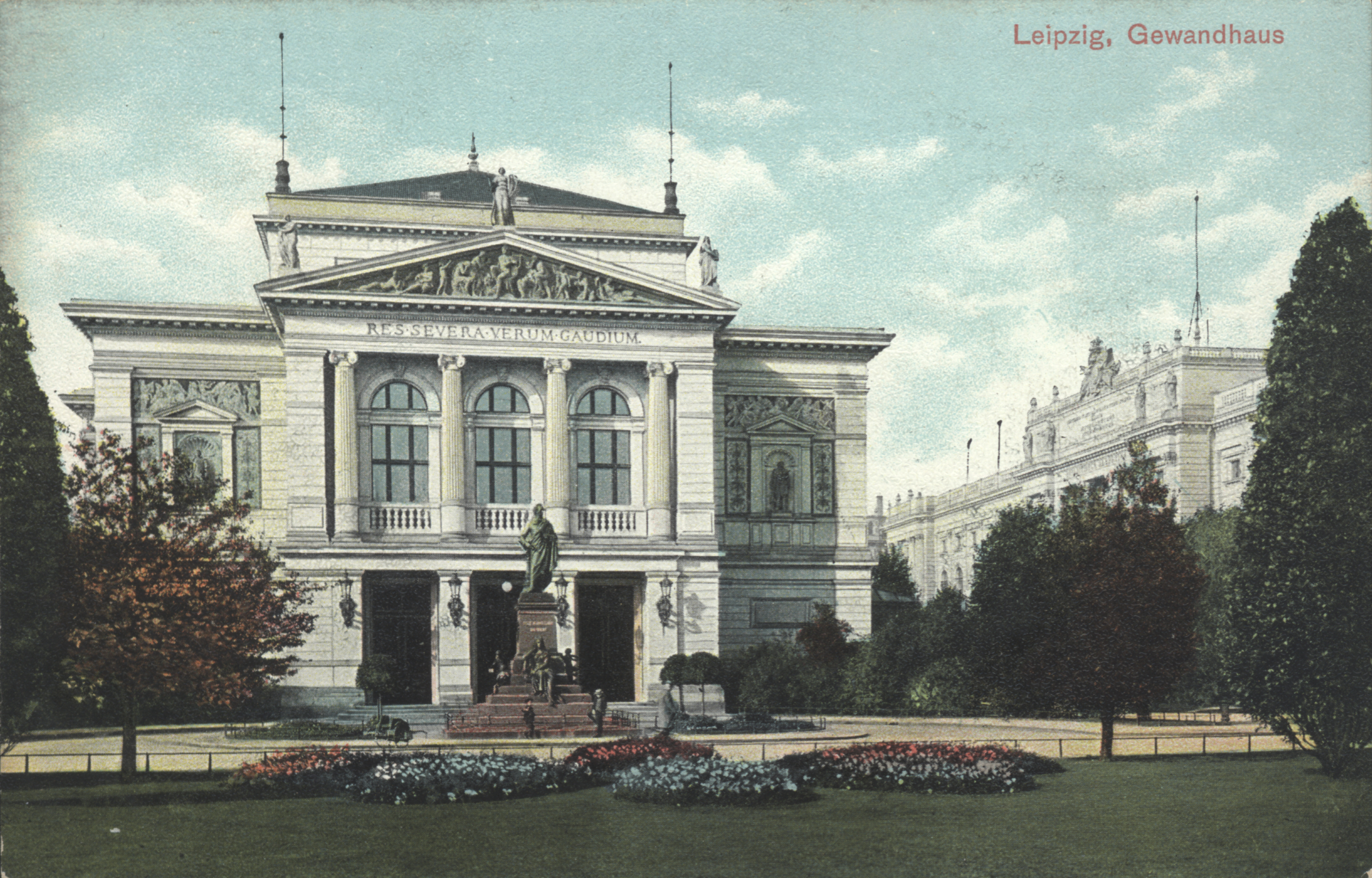
Second Gewandhaus, Leipzig, 1882–84

== Life ==
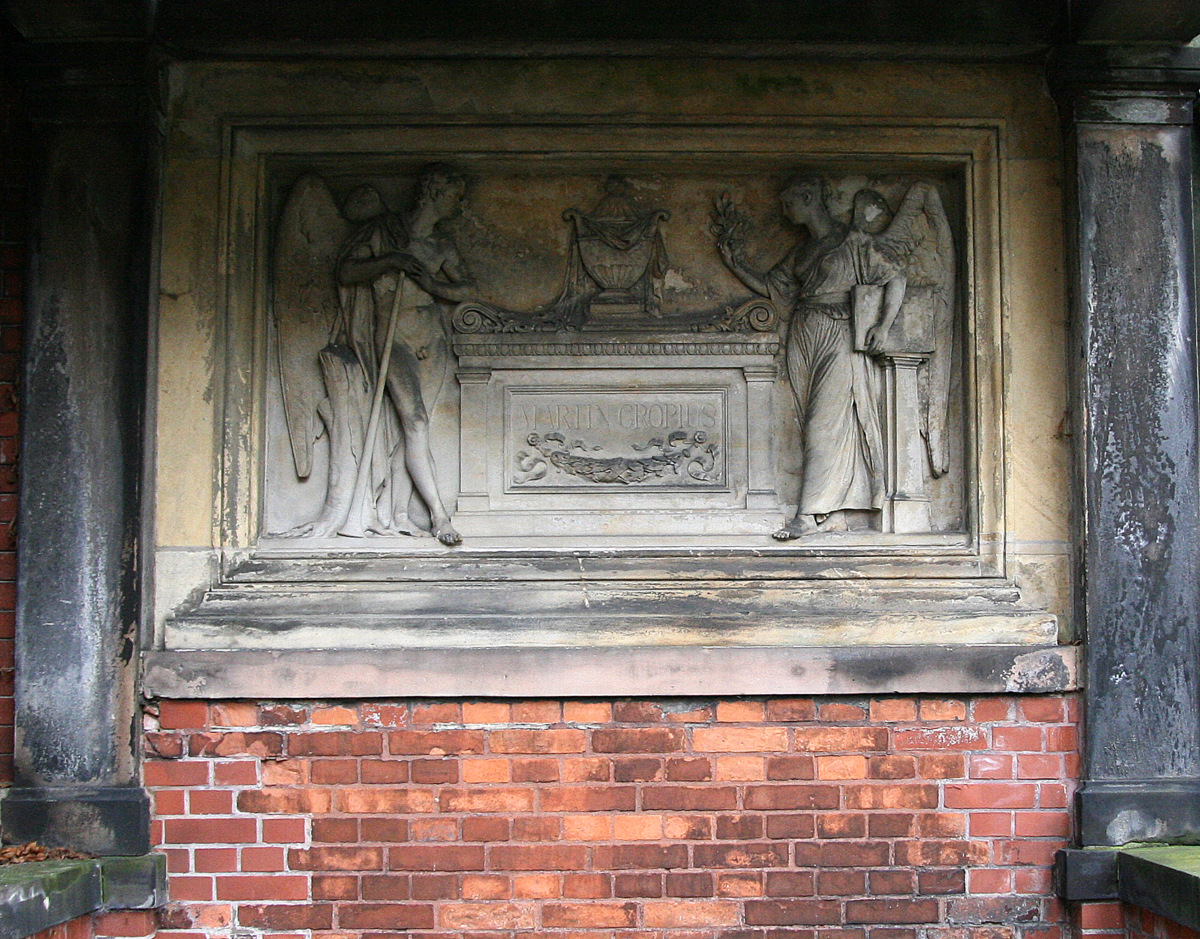
Gropius's grave in Berlin

Gropius studied at the Bauakademie in Berlin and after graduation worked as a private architect. He received artistic direction from Karl Friedrich Schinkel and Karl Bötticher and continued his studies with prolonged trips through Greece and Italy.

In 1856 Gropius was appointed to a professorship at the Academy of Applied Art and was later a member of the Berlin-Brandenburg Academy of Sciences and Humanities and the Austrian Academy of Sciences. Until his death he worked with Heino Schmieden to develop Fa. Gropius & Schmieden is one of the largest architecture firms in Berlin.

Martin Gropius was the great-uncle of architect and Bauhaus founder Walter Gropius.

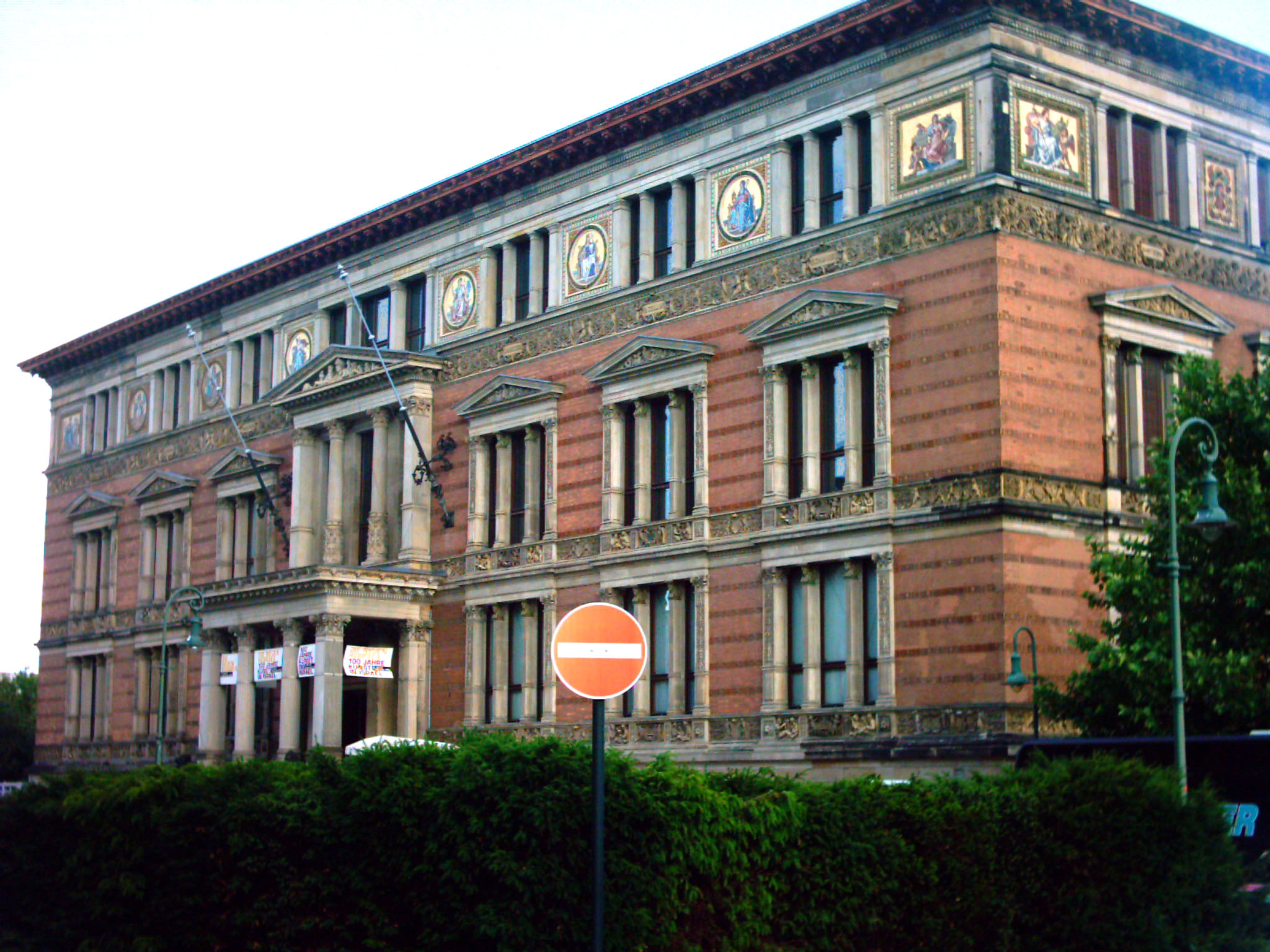
Applied Arts Museum (Martin Gropius Bau), Berlin, 1877–81

The present-day Martin Gropius Bau in Berlin was built in 1881 based on plans by Martin Gropius and Heino Schmieden as an applied art museum (the Kunstgewerbemuseum Berlin). It was constructed in the style of the Italian Renaissance and has a central atrium. Mosaics with allegories from various ages and the coats of arms of German states decorate the spaces between windows. After World War I the Bau housed the Museum of Pre- and Early History as well as the oriental art collection. In the last weeks of the Second World War the building was bombed. Reconstruction of the building began in 1978 after it was placed under protection for historic preservation in 1966. Another restoration took place in 1999/2000. Today the Martin Gropius Bau is an important space for special exhibits of all kinds.

Martin Gropius is buried at Dreifaltigkeitsfriedhof 2 in the Kreuzberg neighborhood of Berlin.

== Works ==
Along with representative buildings (e.g. the university in Kiel and the Gewandhaus in Leipzig), many clinics and hospitals were built in Berlin and Brandenburg based on Gropius's designs.

- Martin Gropius Krankenhaus (Neuro-Psychiatric Hospital) in Neustadt-Eberswalde
- Ungern-Sternberg palace in Tallinn, nowadays the main building of Estonian Academy of Sciences (1865–1868)
- Friedrichshain Hospital in Berlin (1868–74), with Heino Schmieden
- Hospital in Wiesbaden
- University Building in Kiel (1873–76)
- Military Hospital in Tempelhof, Berlin (1875–77)
- Manor House in Neuruppin-Gentzrode (1876–1877)
- Applied Art Museum (Martin Gropius Bau) in Kreuzberg, Berlin (1877–81), with Heino Schmieden
- Second Gewandhaus in Leipzig (1882–84), completed by Heino Schmieden after Gropius's death.
- Old Library at the University of Greifswald
- Bureau of Mines in Saarbrücken (1877–1880)
- Prussian Eastern Railway Headquarters in Bromberg, now Bydgoszcz, Poland
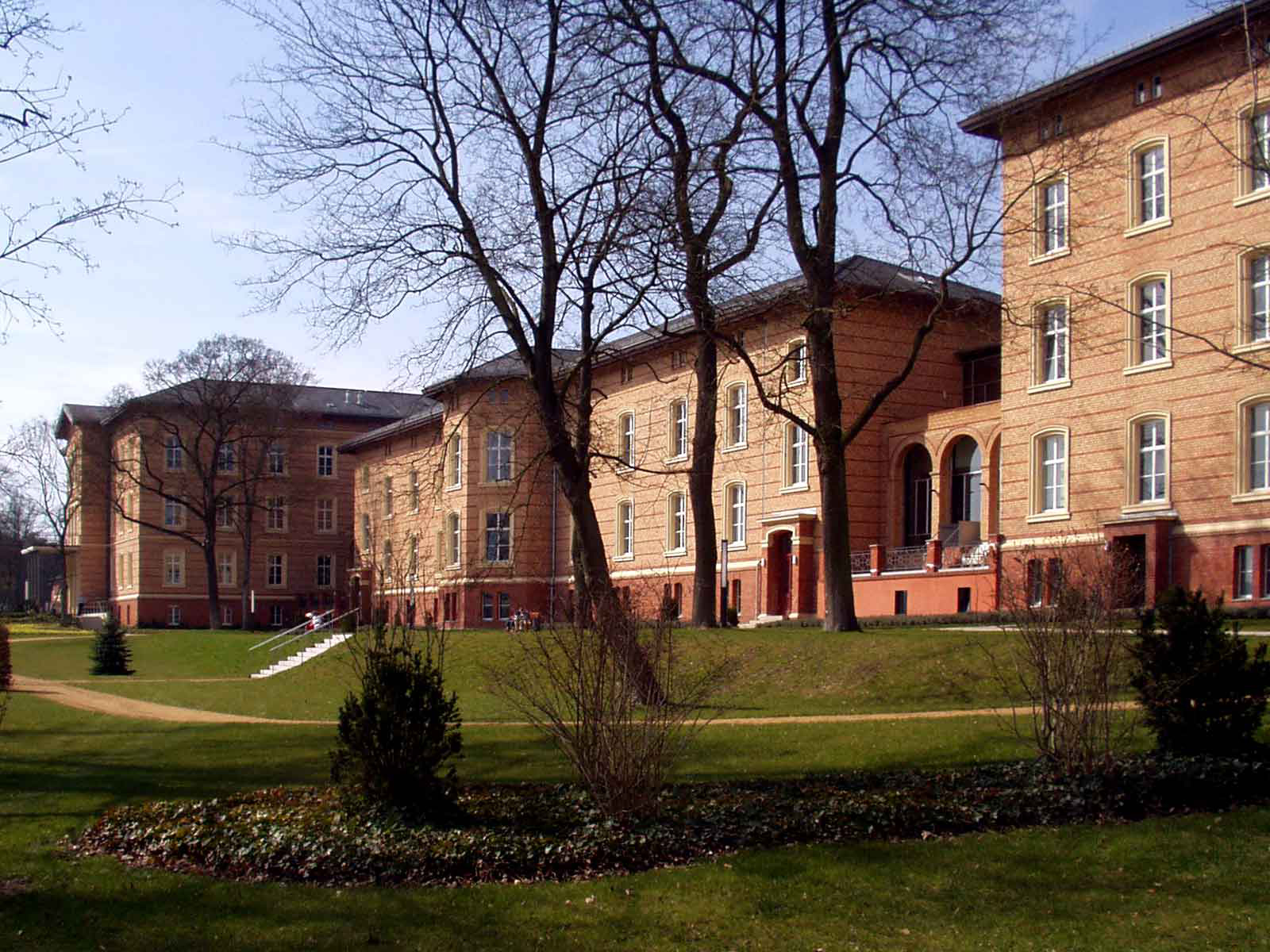
Martin Gropius Krankenhaus

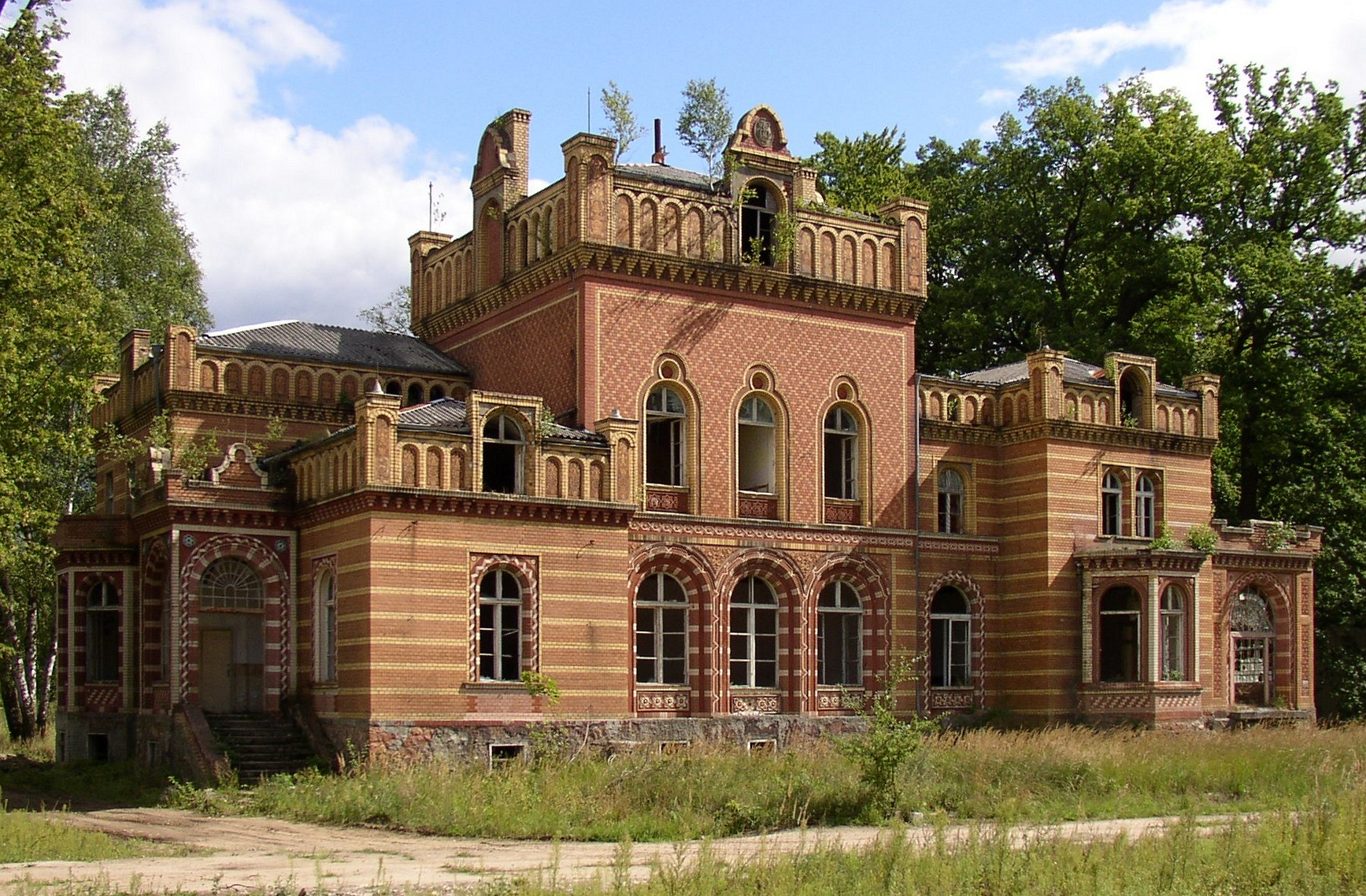
Manor House in Neuruppin-Gentzrode

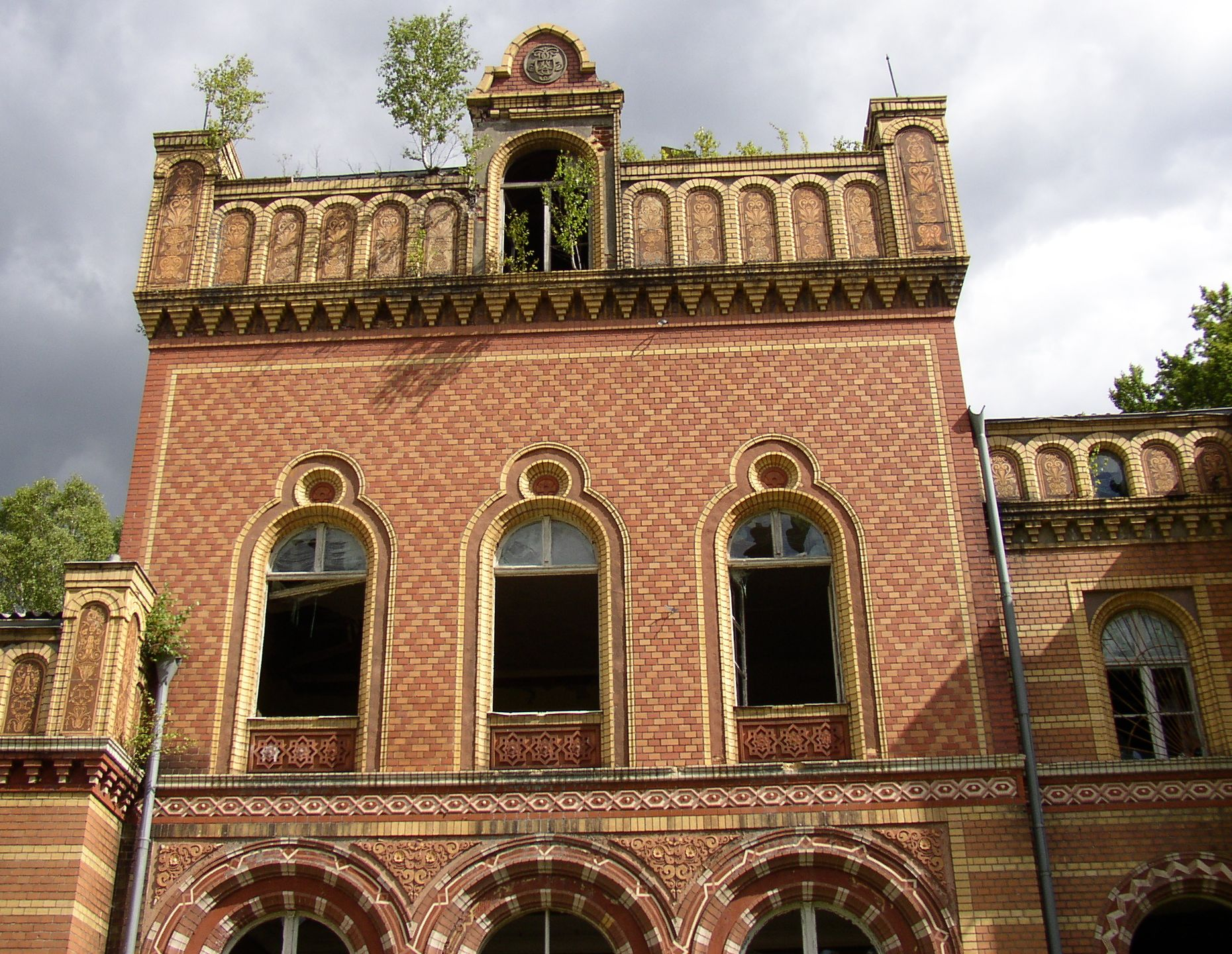
Facade

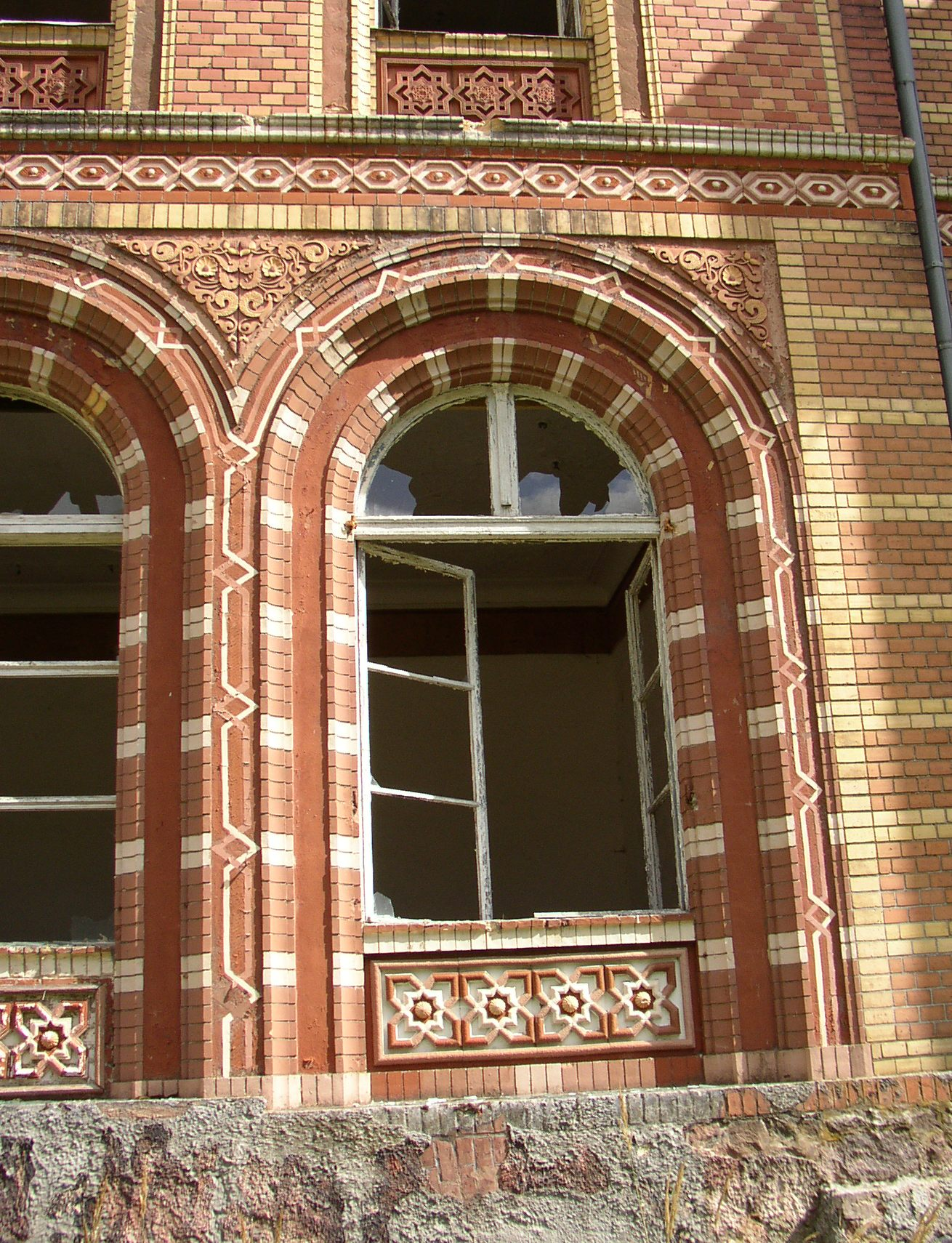
Window

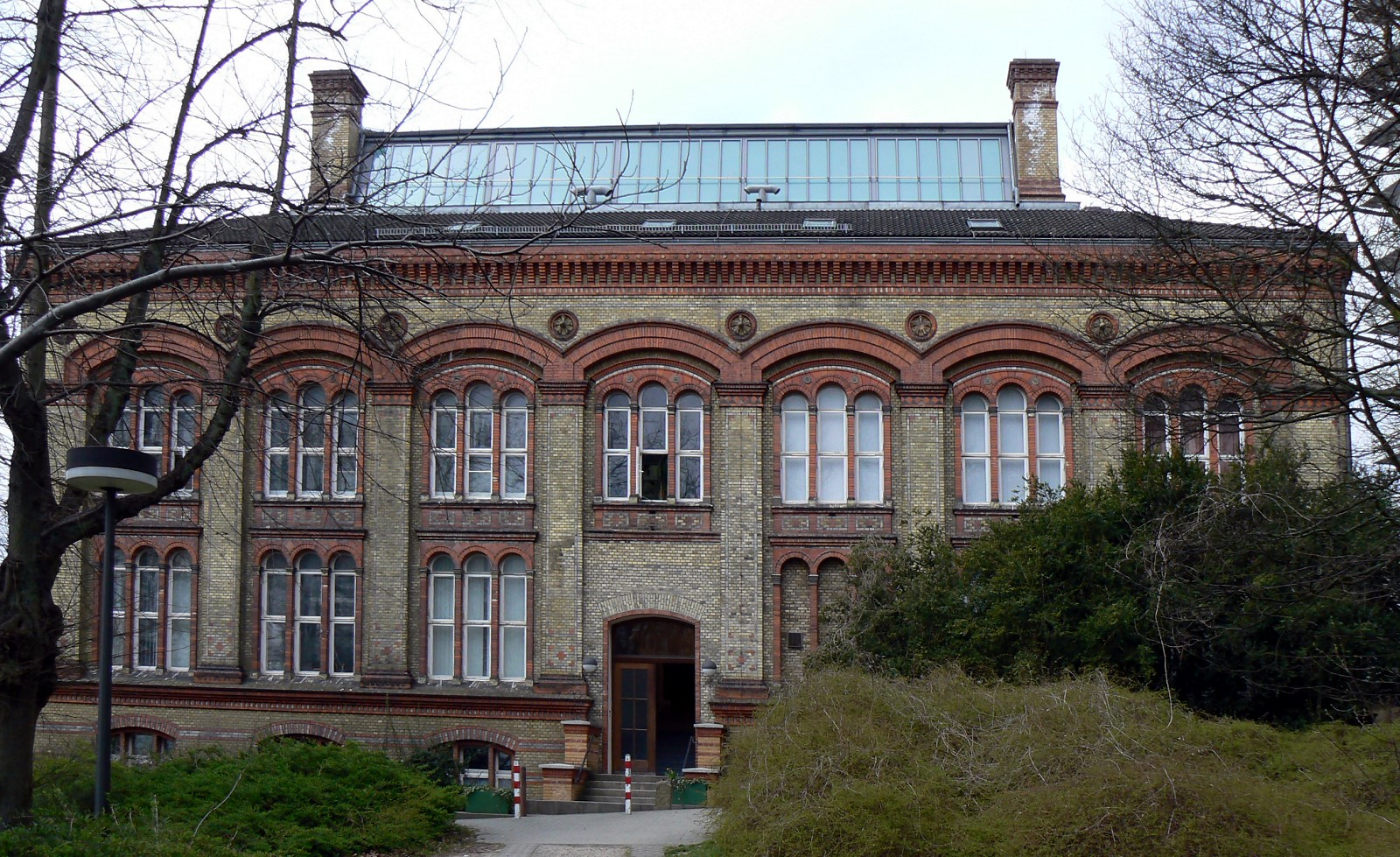
Zoological Museum of Kiel University

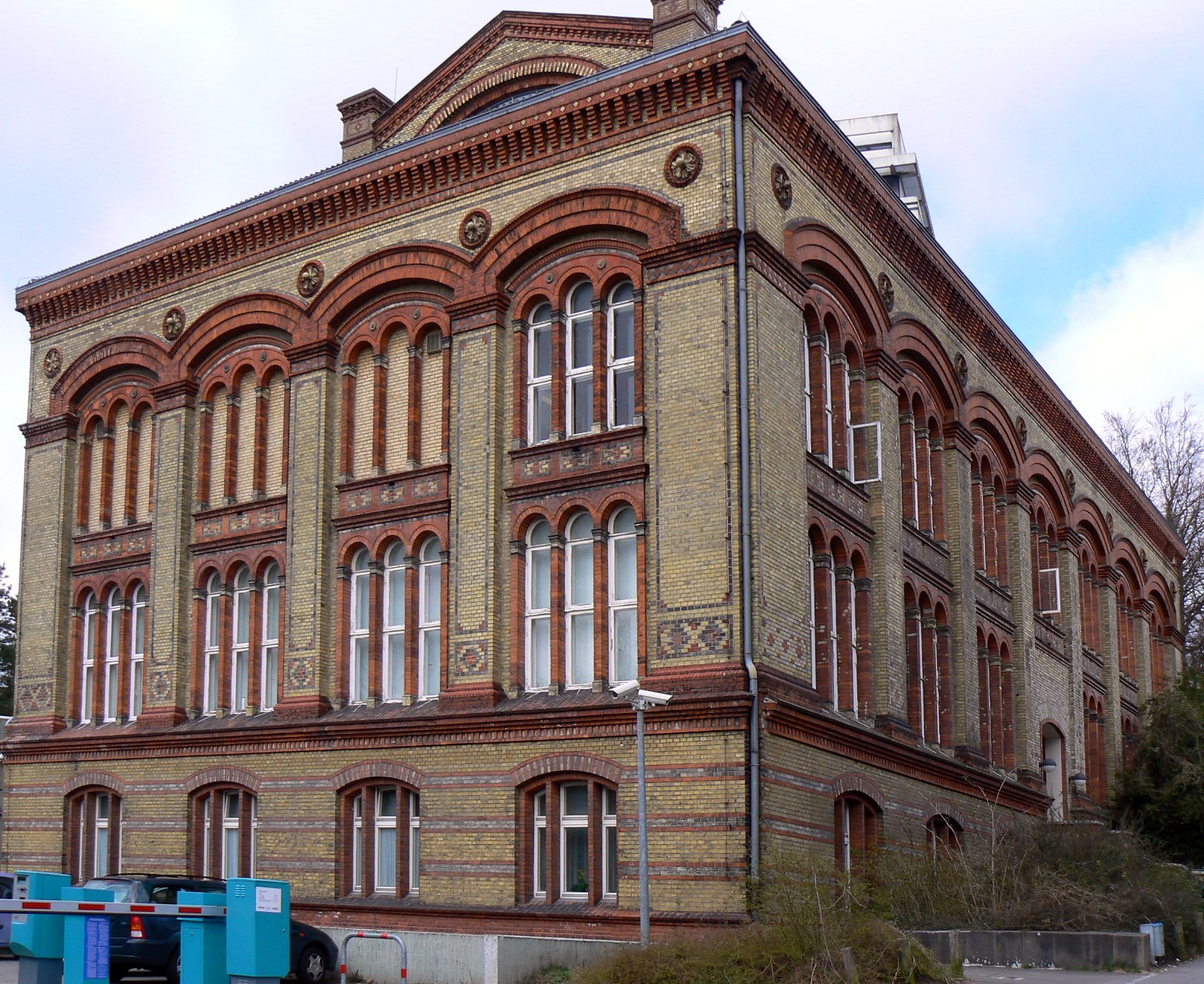
Zoological Museum of Kiel University

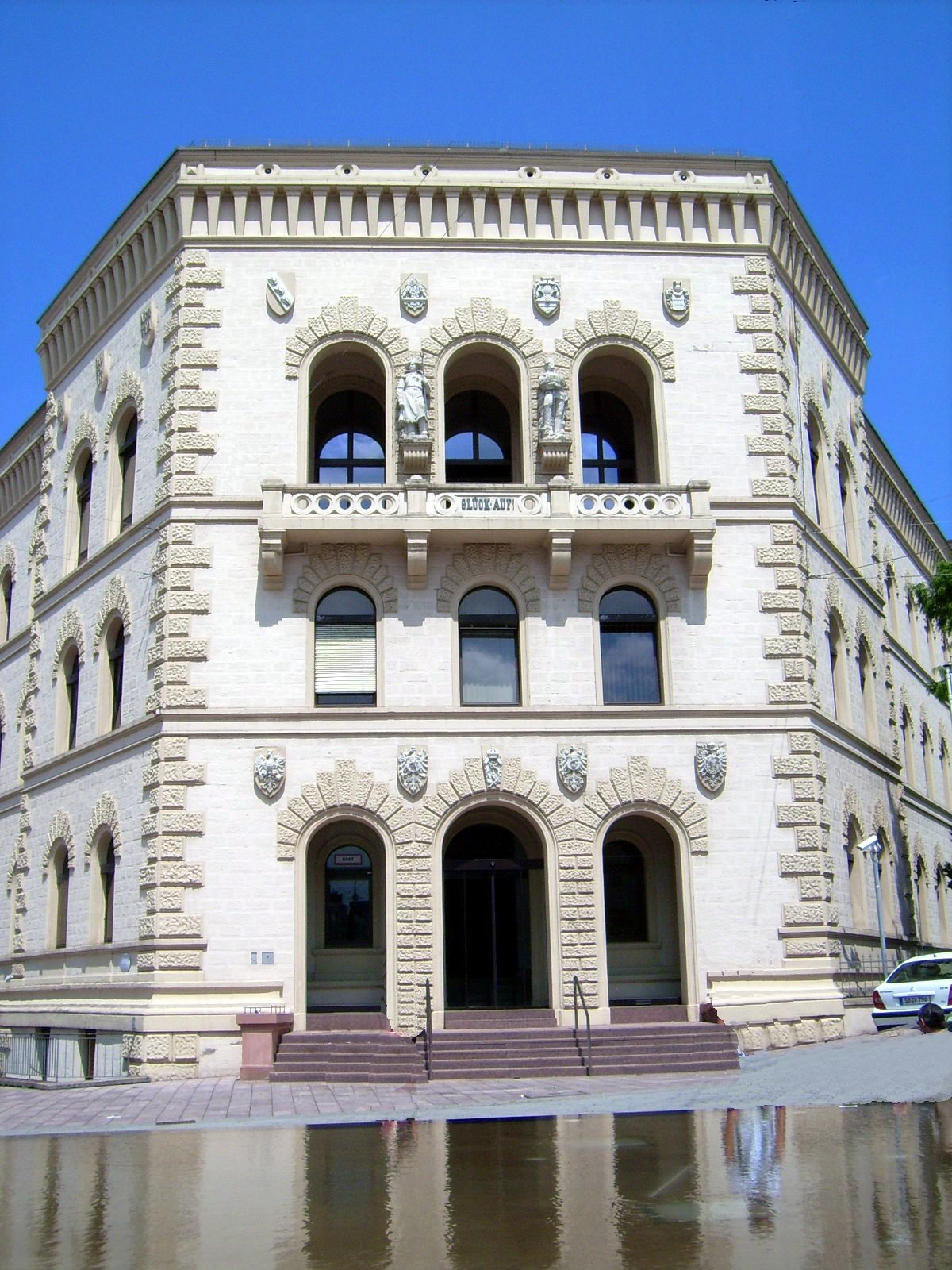
Bureau of Mines Saarbrücken, 1877–80

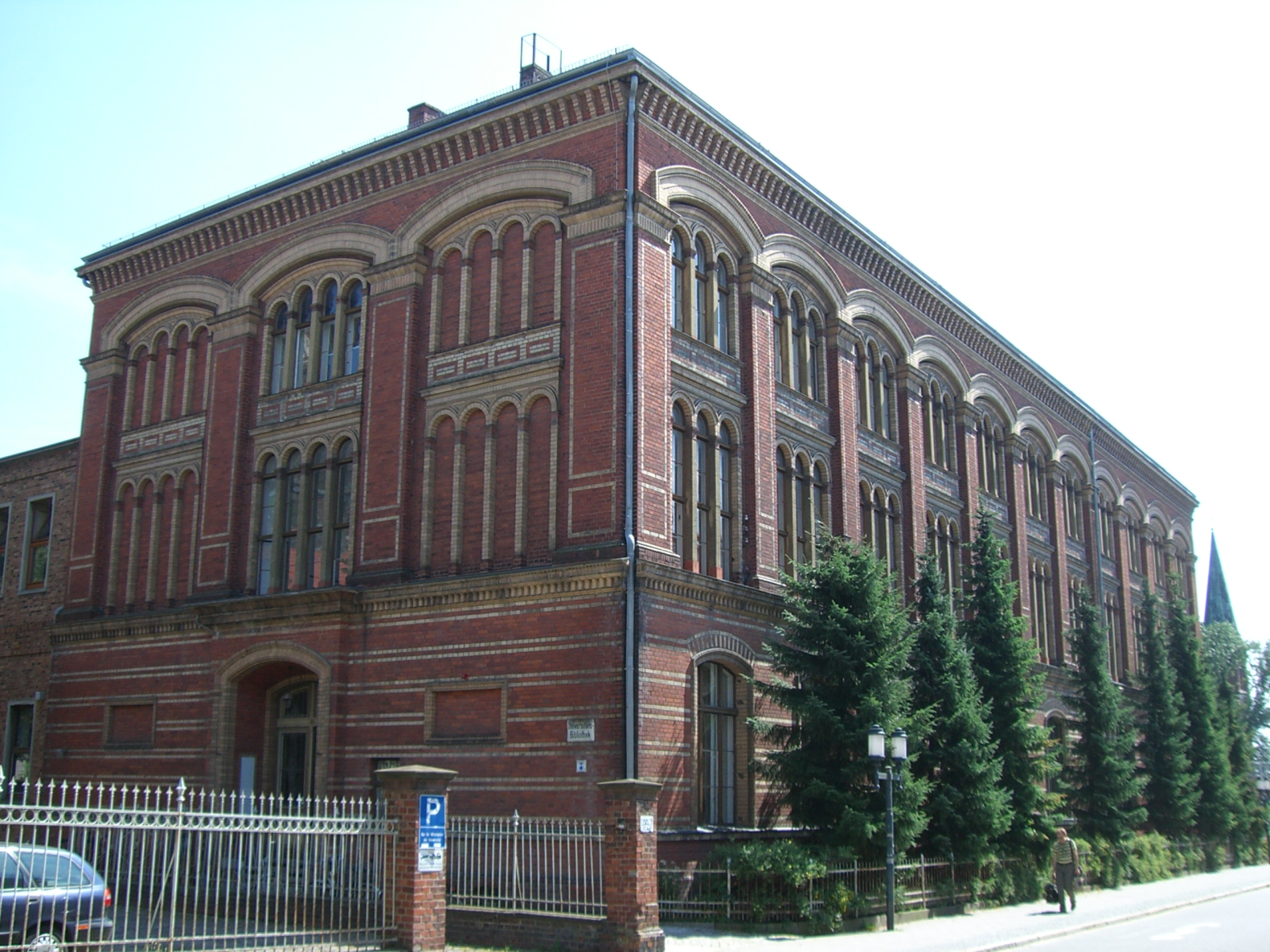
Greifswald University Library

Many houses and villas in Berlin and its environs were built based on Gropius's designs. For example:

- the Heesesche Villa at Lützow-Ufer
- the Bleichrödersche Villa in Charlottenburg
- the Mendelssohn House (with Heino Schmieden)
- the Gruner-Haus
- the Lessing-Haus
- the Schloss Biesdorf
- the Manor House Schloss Calberwisch bei Osterburg/Altmark (gemeinsam mit Heino Schmieden)

== See also ==
- Prussian Eastern Railway Headquarters in Bydgoszcz

== Literature ==
=== Own Writings ===
- Martin Gropius: Die Provinzial-Irren-Anstalt zu Neustadt-Eberswalde. Ernst & Korn, Berlin 1869.
- Karl Friedrich Schinkel: Dekorationen innerer Räume. Acht Blatt, hrsg. von Martin Gropius. Ernst & Korn, Berlin 1874.
- Martin Gropius: Das Städtische Allgemeine Krankenhaus im Friedrichshain zu Berlin. Ernst & Korn, Berlin 1876.
- Martin Gropius, Heino Schmieden: Dekorationen innerer Räume. Ernst & Korn, Berlin 1877,1–3.
- Martin Gropius (Hrsg.): Archiv für ornamentale Kunst. Red. durch Martin Gropius, hrsg. v. Deutsches Gewerbe-Museum Berlin. Mit erl. Text von L. Lohde. Winkelmann-Springer, Berlin 1870–71.

=== Further reading ===
- V. von Weltzien (Hrsg.): Das zweite Garnison-Lazareth für Berlin bei Tempelhof. Nach dem vom Königlichen Kriegs-Ministerium aufgestellten Bauprogramm entworfen und ausgeführt von Gropius & Schmieden. Ernst & Korn, Berlin 1879.
- Gropius in Eberswalde. Gropius-Bau der Landesklinik Eberswalde. be-bra, Berlin 2002. ISBN 3-89809-036-1
- Barbara Happe, Martin S. Fischer: Haus Auerbach von Walter Gropius mit Adolf Meyer. Wasmuth, Tübingen-Berlin 2003. ISBN 3-8030-0635-X
