= Martin Gropius Krankenhaus =

Coordinates: 52°50′43.4″N 13°49′41.6″E

Geography
- Location: Eberswalde, Germany

History
- Opened: 1865

Links
- Lists: Hospitals in Germany

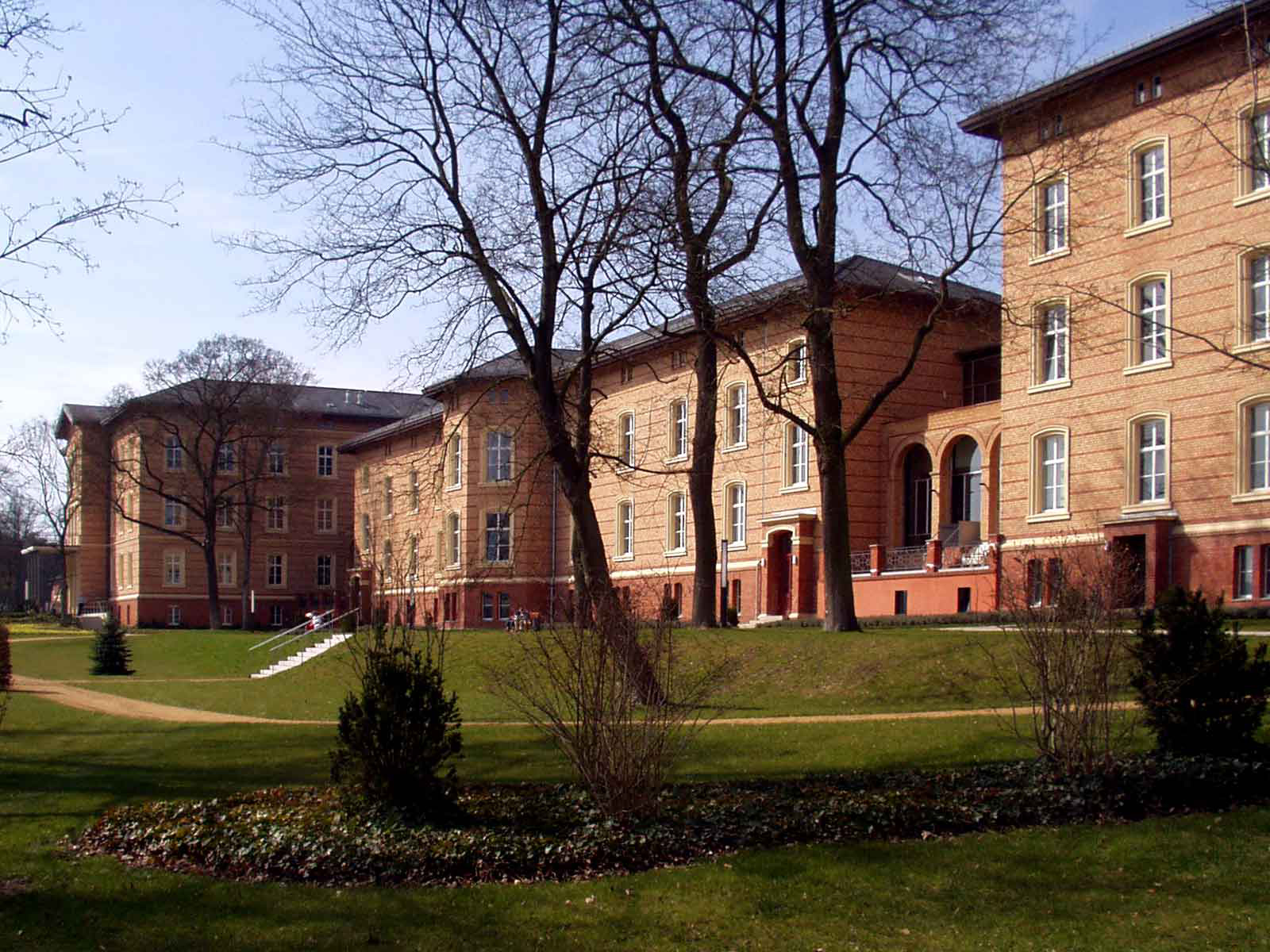
Martin Gropius Krankenhaus

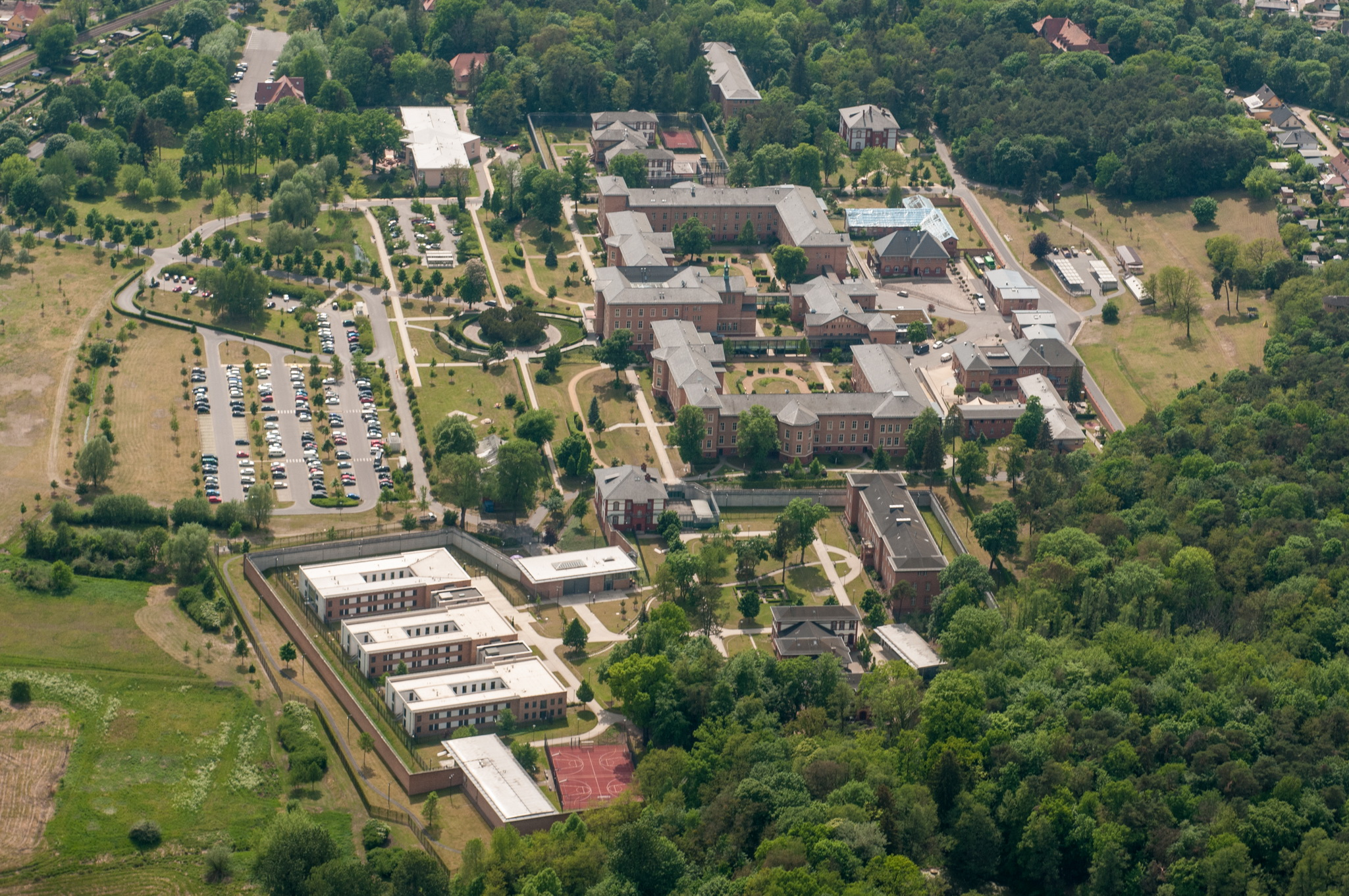
aerial view 2017

The Martin Gropius Krankenhaus is a neuro-psychiatric hospital in Eberswalde, Germany. It was built from 1862–1865 by architect Martin Gropius from Berlin. It was commissioned by the Estates of the then-Prussian Province of Brandenburg as an insane asylum.

== Overview ==
The commissioners had installed an advisory board of psychiatrists. The various tracts were built to the needs of patients with specific disorders and for specific therapies. This design mirrored the developing medical specialization.

The complex continued to house an asylum of the Province of Brandenburg until 1945. Then, the Red Army used it until 1994 as an army hospital. The psychiatric hospital was placed in auxiliary buildings. From 1997, the building was renovated. Since 2002, the neuro-psychiatric hospital is again housed in the main building. It is now jointly owned by the districts of Barnim and Uckermark and the town of Eberswalde. Since 2006, it carries the name of its architect.

The hospital now runs departments of Neurology, Sleep Medicine and various sub-specialized Psychiatry centers including Child and adolescent psychiatry, Psychosomatic Medicine, Geriatric Psychiatry and Forensic Psychiatry.

== Literature ==
- Martin Gropius: Die Provinzial-Irren-Anstalt zu Neustadt-Eberswalde. Ernst & Korn, Berlin, 1869.

Facsimile in:
Landesklinik Eberswalde (Hrsg.): Der Martin-Gropius-Bau der Landesklinik Eberswalde. be.bra Verlag, Berlin, 2002, ISBN 978-3-89809-036-0.

- Jens Fehlauer: Architektur für den Wahnsinn. Die „Land-Irren-Anstalt Neustadt-Eberswalde“. be.bra Verlag, Berlin, 2005, ISBN 978-3-937233-22-2.
