= Kunstbibliothek Berlin =

Art library in Berlin

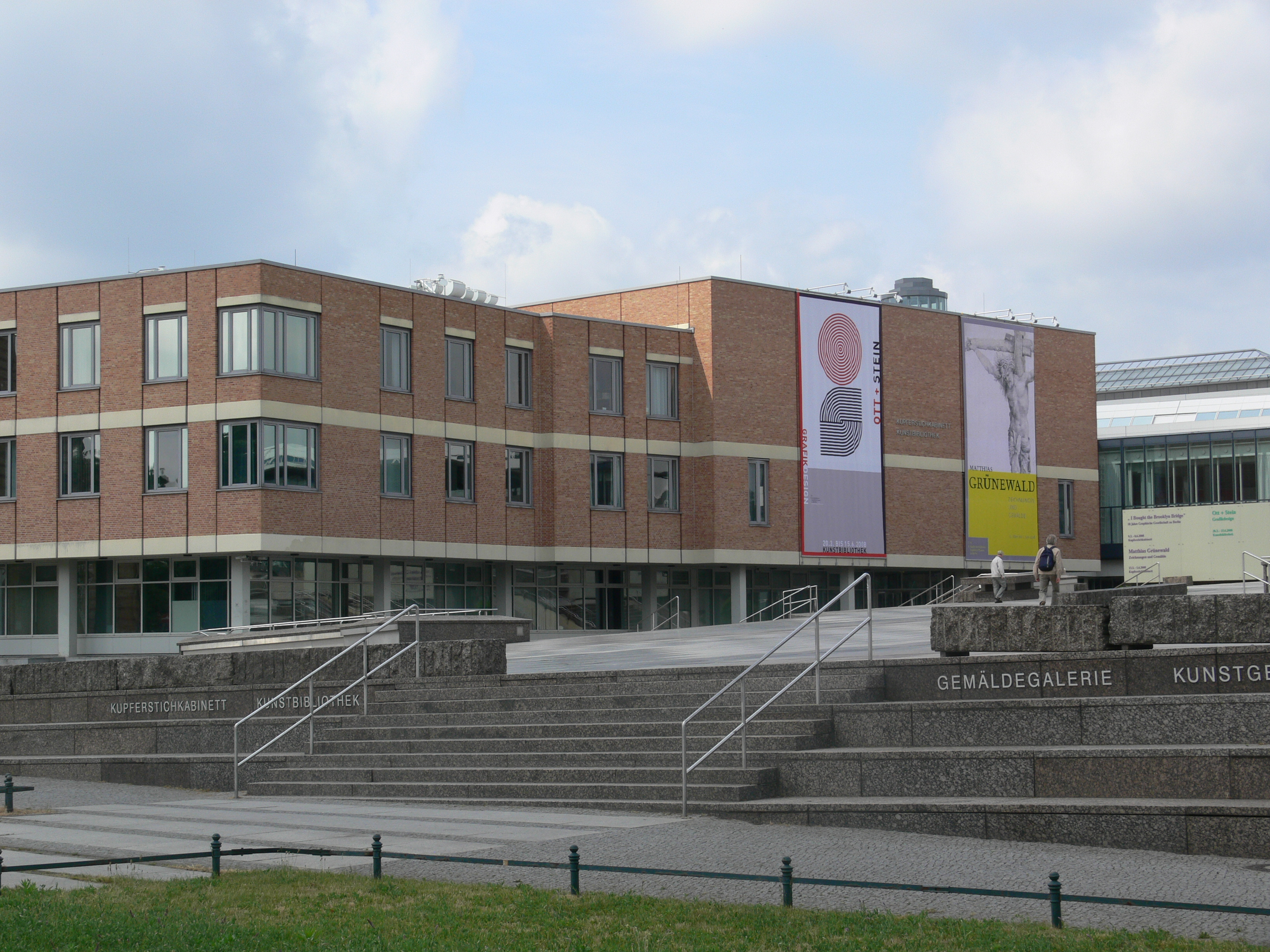
- 52°30′30.16″N 13°22′1.01″E
- Location: Matthäikirchplatz 6 Berlin, Germany, Germany
- Established: 1972

Collection
- Items collected: books, photographs
- Size: 333,057 books 24,000 rare books 59,809 auction catalogs 49,831 microforms 1422 journal subscriptions
- Legal deposit: No

Access and use
- Access requirements: Open to anyone with a need to use the collections and services
- Circulation: Does not circulate

Other information
- Director: Joachim Brand
- Website: Kunstbibliothek

The Berlin Art Library (German: Kunstbibliothek Berlin) is an agency of the Berlin State Museums under the auspices of the Prussian Cultural Heritage Foundation. It has approximately 400,000 volumes and ranks among Germany's leading institutions specializing in the literature of Art History. The library is located on the Kulturforum in Berlin-Tiergarten, Germany and attracts 35,000 visitors annually.

The Library also has a comprehensive photographic collection. Its holdings date back to the very early days of photography, through Pictorialism around the late 19th and early 20th centuries, through the Neues Sehen or New Vision of the 1920s, to the new artistic styles of the present day. Since June 2004, the collection has held exhibitions under the same roof as the Helmut Newton Foundation at the Museum of Photography opposite the Zoologischer Garten station. After a complete restoration of the Kaisersaal, the Art Library Photographic Collection now has its own exhibition space.

Selections of works from the library's many other collections are regularly presented in special exhibitions. The neighboring Kupferstichkabinett Berlin (Museum of Prints and Drawings) concentrates primarily on fine art drawings and prints. The Art Library does not circulate, but its collections can be viewed upon request in the Art Library's study room.

== The collections ==
The Art Library acquires and researches scientific literature on the history of European art from late antiquity to the present. The collection also includes:

- 1,400 current international periodicals
- Architectural drawings
- Drawings and prints in the field of Applied arts
- The Lipperheide Costume Library
- Posters and advertisements
- Graphic and Book design collections
- Photographic Collection
  - Historic photographs archive,
  - Collection of artistic photography
  - Personal bequests archive
  - Photogrammetric holdings
  - Historical postcards from the 19th and 20th century.
