= HOLODECK architects =

International studio

Practice information
- Partners: Marlies Breuss and Michael Ogertschnig
- Founded: 1998
- Location: Vienna, Austria

Website
- www.holodeckarchitects.com

HOLODECK architects is a Vienna, Austria based architectural studio. Established in 1998, it is a partnership of Marlies Breuss and Michael Ogertschnig.

HOLODECK has created residences, landscape architecture, flexible reusage projects, and public institutions in Austria, Germany, and Thailand.

== Architectural methodology ==
HOLODECK architects' design process is concept based and context orientated. The studio’s strategies and processes analyze information to produce new spatial arrangements that reflect on the surroundings and to introduce the most suitable materials and technology.

== Projects ==
- 2016-2022 kulturzentrum mattersburg / zentrum für kultur und forschung, Mattersburg, Austria
- 2013-2017 austrian embassy bangkok, Bangkok, Thailand
- 2017 archiv der avantgarden AdA, Dresden, Germany
- 2015 double vision, Albrecht Dürer & William Kentridge, Kulturforum Berlin, Germany
- 2015 WDR crossmedia house, Cologne, Germany
- 2009-2015 wirtschaftspark breitensee, Vienna, Austria
- 2009-2014 breitensee studios, Vienna, Austria
- 2009-2012 roof transformations, Vienna, Austria
- 2009-2011 urban topos, Vienna, Austria
- 2011 Aktionsraum 1, MUMOK Museum of contemporary art, Vienna, Austria
- 2005-2008 embedded house, Heiligengeist, Austria
- 2005-2008 stratified townscape, Vienna, Austria
- 2005-2006 spatial appropriation, Vienna, Austria
- 2003-2005 floating house, Siegenfeld, Austria
- 2003-2004 shifthouse, Klagenfurt, Austria
- 2003-2004 marzona book collection, Architekturzentrum Wien AzW, Vienna, Austria
- 2002-2008 22 tops, Wolfsberg, Austria
- 2002-2003 rooftop 02, Vienna, Austria
- 2001-2002 parkhouse, Vienna, Austria
- 1999-2000 hall 01, St. Veit an der Glan, Austria
- 1996-1999 benthouse, Grosshöflein, Austria

== Awards ==
- 2020 Energy Globe Award, Thailand
- 2020 European Architecture Awards
- 2019 Mies van der Rohe Award Nominee
- 2019 LEAF - Leading European Architects Forum Award
- 2019 The Plan Award
- 2019 Iconic Awards Best of Best Environment Building
- 2019 Architecture Masterprize Firm Of The Year Award
- 2018 Austrian Green Planet Building Awards
- 2014 Best Architects Award
- 2010 Landesbaupreis Kärnten Acknowledgement

== Teaching ==
Since 1996, the studio gives lectures and tutors design studios at universities.

- The human needs, Research and Design Studio, TU Vienna and Kasetsart University Bangkok, 2019

== Architecture discourse ==
- reflecting human needs, TURN ON Architekturfestival, Vienna, 2021
- The Future of “Global Architecture”, Faculty of Architecture and Spatial Planning, TU Vienna, 2019
- austrian embassy bangkok, TURN ON Architekturfestival, Vienna, 2018
- stratified townscape, 22 tops, TURN ON Architekturfestival, Vienna, 2009

== Literature ==
- Society now! - Architektur. Projekte und Positionen, Published by Michael Seidel und Gerhard Steixner, Building Design and Construction, TU Vienna, 2009-2019. ISBN 978-3-03860-178-4
- Aktionsraum 1, catalogue for the exhibition at the MUMOK, published by Sophie Haaser, Rainer Fuchs, Museum Moderner Kunst Stiftung Ludwig Vienna, 2011. ISBN 978-3-902490-78-0
- Double Vision Albrecht Dürer & William Kentridge, catalogue for the exhibition in Kupferstichkabinett Berlin, 2015. ISBN 978-3-944874-37-1
- The Human Needs, published by Marlies Breuss and Faculty of Architecture, Kasetsart University, Bangkok, 2019. ISBN 978-616-278-534-4
