= Calvatone Victoria =

Gilded bronze statue of the Roman Imperial period

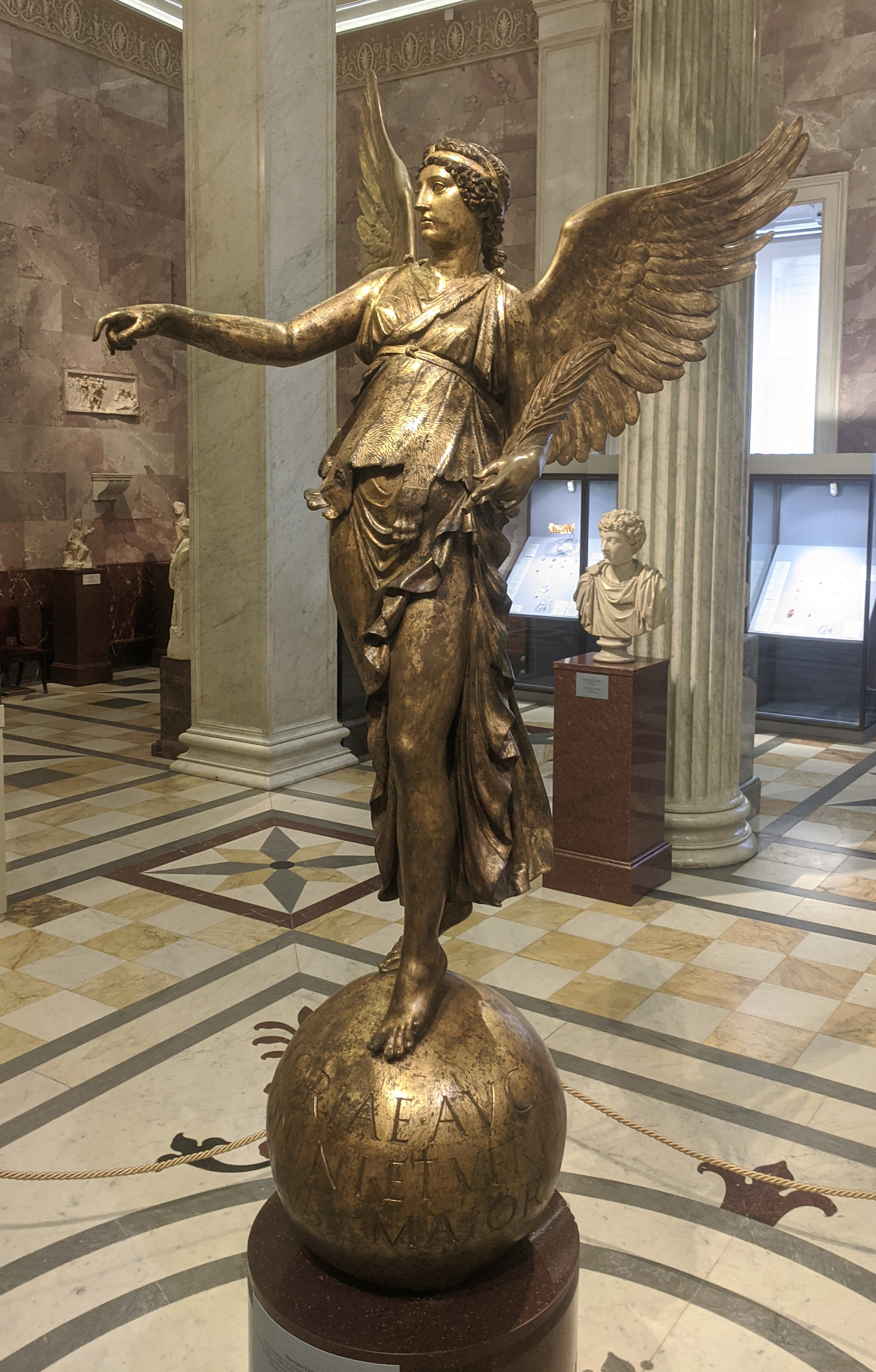
Calvatone Victoria

The Calvatone Victoria is a gilt bronze statue from the Roman Imperial period. It belongs to the inventory of the Antikensammlung Berlin, but is now held in Hermitage Museum in Saint Petersburg.

== Description and inscription ==
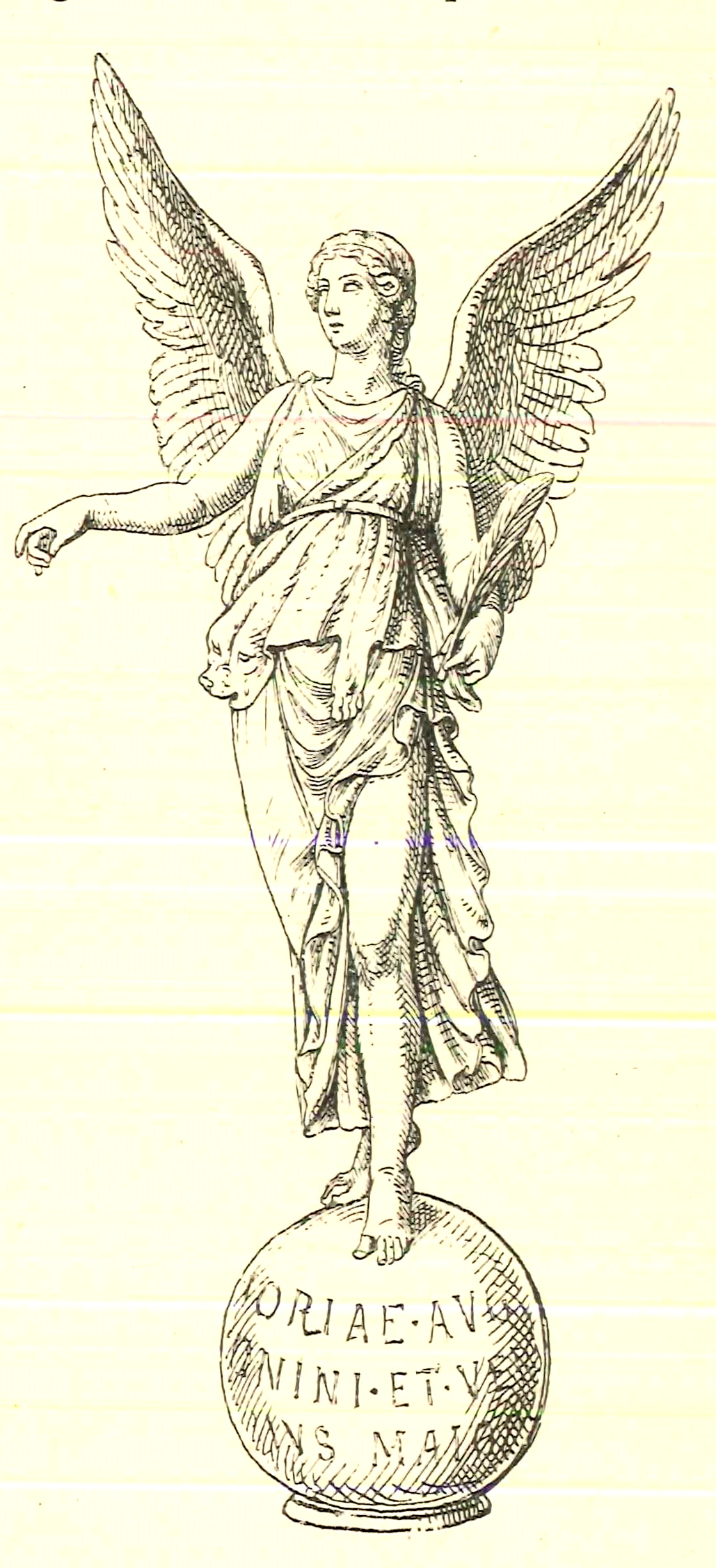
Sketch of the Calvatone Victoria

The piece is a 1.70 metre high statue of a winged woman cast from bronze. This is the traditional iconography of the Roman victory goddess, Victoria. She stands atop a globe and is depicted in the style of a Hellenistic maenad performing a movement somewhere between dancing and floating. She wears a chiton and has comparatively long legs, with the left leg forward, coming out of her dress. A panther skin is tied over her left shoulder and is fastened in place with a girdle at hip-height. The right arm of the figure extends forwards and may originally have held a wreath, while the left arm holds a palm frond (incorporating modern restorations). The head of the statue is based on 5th-century BC Classical Greek models and looks slightly to the right. The hair is held in place with a cord which wraps around the head twice and is tied in place above the forehead and at the back.

On the globe is an inscription in roughly 5.5 cm high letters, reading Victoriae Aug(ustorum) / Antonini et Veri / M(arcus) Satrius Maior, "To the Victory of Emperors Antoninus and Verus, Marcus Satrius Maior (dedicated this)." The inscription indicates that the dedicator was the otherwise unknown Marcus Satrius Maior, whose Nomen is well-attested in ancient Northern Italy. The inscription also indicates that the art work was dedicated during the joint-reign of the emperors Marcus Aurelius and Lucius Verus, i.e. 161 to 169 AD. It symbolised the victoriousness and claim to power of these emperors and probably commemorates the successful conclusion to the Parthian War of Lucius Verus (161-166 AD). This could explain why Victoria is depicted, unusually, as a kind of maenad, one of the female companions of the god Dionysus. Lucius Verus was celebrated after the conclusion of the campaign as a "new Dionysos," comparing his expedition to the mythic expedition of Dionysus to the east. The panther skin worn by the Victoria probably also refers to the Orient.

New investigations of the artwork between 2016 and 2019 have led to an alternative interpretation. It was discovered that the wings of the figure are modern restorations, which probably did not form part of the original sculpture. This led to the suggestion that the sculpture was not originally a depiction of Victoria, but of the hunting goddess Diana, who is often depicted wearing a panther skin.

== Discovery, restoration, rediscovery ==
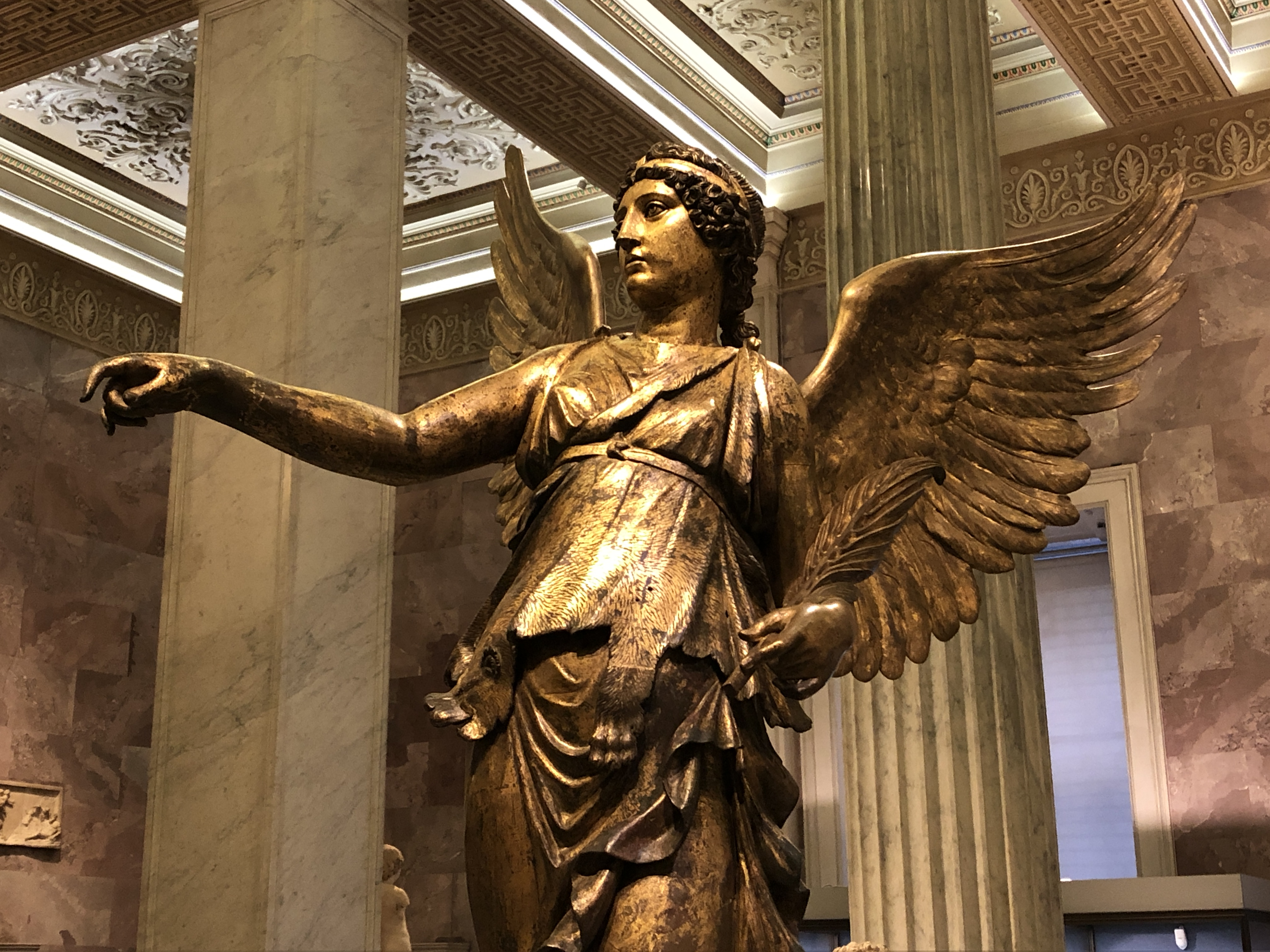
Detail of the Calvatone Victoria.

The statue was discovered at Calvatone, near Cremona in Italy in 1836, in four pieces. In February, farmers working on the estate of Luigi Alovisi found the head. Alovisi instructed them to keep on the lookout for further pieces and on 14 March they found the body, globe, and right arm. The broken pieces were fitted back together without difficulty. The remaining missing pieces were later restored by German conservators. These modern additions consist of: the left arm up to the shoulder (including the palm frond), the left leg (except for the upper ankle and the big toe), the nose, part of the left cheek, a tuft of hair, the wings, and the knot of cloth over her shoulder. The tail of the panther skin is missing. the gilding was still well preserved when the piece was discovered and was extended to cover the restored parts of the sculpture.

In December 1841, Gustav Friedrich Waagen, director of the Berlin Gemäldegalerie, paid 12,000 lire to acquire the Calvatone Victoria for the Antikensammlung Berlin, where it remained on display until 1939, when the museum was closed owing to the outbreak of World War II. During this period, several copies were made, which were displayed in Berlin, Rome, Cremona, Moscow, and elsewhere. In 1941, the original was stored with other items from the Antikensammlung in the vault of the New Reich's Mint at Molkenmarkt, which was then still under construction. At the end of the Second World War, the Victoria was recorded as lost. It is now known that it was selected in 1946 by Russian experts in ancient art for transport to the Soviet Union. When it arrived in Russia, however, it was placed in storage at The Hermitage in Leningrad, where it was accidentally assigned to the department of 17th-century French sculpture. Through museological research and conservatorial analysis by Russian specialists, the Victoria was eventually identified and correctly catalogued. In 2016, Russian scholars revealed that it was one of the "war-related transfers" from Berlin museums in Russia. Thereafter, the president of the Prussian Cultural Heritage Foundation, Hermann Parzinger, and the general director of the Hermitage, Mikhail Piotrovsky, agreed to collaborate on researching and restoring the Victoria, which was by then in a poor state of preservation. After the completion of this work, it was presented to the public in a special exhibition at the Hermitage, called "The Victoria of Calvatone: The Fate of a Masterpiece," which ran from 7 December 2019 to 8 March 2020.

== Bibliography ==
- Conze, Alexander (1891). Königliche Museen zu Berlin: Beschreibung der antiken Skulpturen mit Ausschluss der pergamenischen Fundstücke. Berlin: W. Spemann. p. 7 no. 5.
- Bruno Schröder: Die Victoria von Calvatone (= Programm zum Winckelmannsfeste der Archäologischen Gesellschaft zu Berlin. 67). G. Reimer, Berlin 1907 (Digitalisat).
- Federica Giacobello: Origine e diffusione dell’immagine della Vittoria su globo. La Vittoria di Calvatone, un capolavoro dell’arte romana ritrovato e perduto. In: Archivio storico lombardo. Serie 12, Band 10 (= Band 130), 2004, pp. 353–368.
- Hölscher, Tonio (1967). Victoria Romana. Archäologische Untersuchungen zur Geschichte und Wesensart der römischen Siegesgöttin von den Anfängen bis zum Ende des 3. Jhs. n. Chr. Mainz: Philipp von Zabern. pp. 36 f.
- Renzo Lambertini: "Satrio della Vittoria (a proposito di CIL V.4089)." in Minima Epigraphica et Papyrologica. vol. VII–VIII (= fascicle 9–10), 2004–2005, pp. 315–328.
- Dokumentation der Verluste. Band V.1: Antikensammlung: Skulpturen, Vasen, Elfenbein und Knochen, Goldschmuck, Gemmen und Kameen. Staatliche Museen zu Berlin, Berlin 2005, p. 36 (Image) and p. 39 (Catalogue entry).
- The Hermitage and Antikensammlung Berlin: Die Victoria von Calvatone. Schicksal eines Meisterwerks. Verlag der Staatlichen Eremitage, Sankt Petersburg 2020, ISBN 978-3-88609-844-6 (Catalogue for the Hermitage exhibition, 6 December 2019 – 8 March 2020).
