= Prussian Cultural Heritage Foundation =

German federal government body

Coordinates: 52°30′24.30″N 13°21′18.53″E

Prussian Cultural Heritage Foundation Stiftung Preußischer Kulturbesitz (SPK)
- Established: 1957
- Mission: Acquire and protect the cultural legacy of the former State of Prussia
- President: Marion Ackermann
- Staff: 2000
- Budget: €137.8 million (2020)
- Address: Von-der-Heydt-Straße 16-18
- Location: Berlin, Germany
- Website: preussischer-kulturbesitz.de

The Prussian Cultural Heritage Foundation (German: Stiftung Preußischer Kulturbesitz; SPK) is a German federal government body that oversees 27 museums and cultural organizations in and around Berlin, Germany. Its purview includes all of Berlin's State Museums, the Berlin State Library, the Prussian Privy State Archives and a variety of institutes and research centers. As such, it is one of the largest cultural organizations in the world, and also the largest cultural employer in Germany with around 2,000 staff as of 2020. More than four million people visited its museums in 2019.

The SPK was established in 1957 with the mission to acquire and preserve the cultural legacy of the former State of Prussia. Its current operations include the preservation and care of the museum collections and the continuation of academic and scientific research to encourage learning and understanding between different peoples.

Hermann Parzinger became president of the foundation in 2008. In July 2024 the foundation's governing body announced that Marion Ackermann, until then responsible for the Staatliche Kunstsammlungen Dresden, would become the new president by June 2025.

== Founding ==
During World War II, the cultural artifacts and fine arts in Prussia, especially in Berlin, came under increasing threat of loss. To protect them from Allied bombing, millions of items were evacuated to relative safety in monasteries, castles and abandoned mines around Germany starting in 1941. With the collapse of the Third Reich in 1945, many of these collections wound up damaged, destroyed, or variously hidden in the Allied occupation zones. All the former Prussian institutions ceased to officially exist when the State of Prussia was abolished in 1947, placing these assets in further doubt. As Germany became divided into West and East, what remained of the buildings and scattered collections were also separated by the Iron Curtain.

The Prussian Cultural Heritage Foundation began in 1957 by a West German constitutional mandate to find and preserve the collections still stored throughout the former western occupation zones. In 1961, efforts began to move these materials to West Berlin. From the mid-1960s onward, a series of Modernist buildings were constructed at the Kulturforum to serve as new homes for the collections, including the Gemäldegalerie, the Neue Nationalgalerie and the Berlin State Library. Upon German Reunification in 1990, the Foundation's role expanded considerably to encompass many of the most important cultural properties of the former East Germany. The most important tasks today are in the consolidation of collections, reconstruction of physical space, conservation-restoration and Provenance research.

== Nazi-looted art ==
In 2012 the Prussian Cultural Heritage Foundation announced the restitution of four works by Munch and Kirchner to the heirs of Professor Curt Glaser, an art historian and collector who was persecuted by the Nazis because of his Jewish heritage. The works were: Edvard Munch's Girls on the beach (mezzotint), Prayer of an old man (woodcut) and Death and the Woman (etching) and a woodcut by Ernst Ludwig Kirchner, Bauer entertainment

The Prussian Cultural Heritage Foundation was a defendant in the case of the Guelph Treasure. Led by president Hermann Parzinger, the Foundation argued in court filings that the sale by a consortium of Jewish dealers to Hermann Göring was not under duress, and that a claim should not be handled by a court in the United States because Germany was protected by the Foreign Sovereign Immunities Act .

== Restructuring ==
In 2018, Minister of State for Culture and Media Monika Grütters appointed a panel which was commissioned with a report on the future of the Foundation. By 2020, the panel proposed dissolving the Foundation and instead creating four separate institutions with separate management: one to oversee the Berlin state museums, one for the Staatsbibliothek (State Library), another for the Geheime Staatsarchiv (Secret State Archive) and a fourth for the Ibero-Amerikanisches Institut (Iberian-American Institute).

This proposal followed recommendations by the German Science Council, which had criticized the SPK as overly complex and inefficient in its current form. To implement the restructuring by 2025, a reform commission was established, including representatives from the federal government, several German states, the SPK Presidium, and museum directors.

However, the plans sparked significant public and political debate. Michelle Müntefering (SPD), Minister of State for Culture in the Foreign Ministry, criticized the dissolution plans, arguing that reforms were necessary but abolishing a globally recognized brand like the SPK was counterproductive. She warned that such a massive reorganization would consume valuable resources and energy better spent on pressing issues like digitalization. In the Neue Zürcher Zeitung, Claudia Schwartz claimed that dissolving the SPK perpetuated an anti-Prussian attitude that reduced the Prussian legacy to a narrative of German guilt. Similarly, Ijoma Mangold, writing in Die Zeit, supported reform but warned against discarding the Prussian past entirely. He emphasized that after reunification, the SPK had come to represent a more progressive Prussia—embodied by reformers such as Stein and Hardenberg and intellectuals like the Humboldt brothers, Wilhelm and Alexander—and had become a cultural cornerstone of the Berlin Republic. Former SPK president Klaus-Dieter Lehmann also warned against dismantling what should instead be more effectively networked. In early 2021, the current president, Hermann Parzinger, echoed similar concerns without directly referencing the reform plans, emphasizing the increasingly integrated roles of libraries, archives, and museums as interconnected knowledge repositories.

Four years after its recommendations, the German Council of Science and Humanities noted rather negatively that "the institutions were not made independent and instead the structures within the foundation network were to be reformed".

On January 30, 2025, the Bundestag approved a reform of the Stiftung Preußischer Kulturbesitz (SPK). It was supported by the SPD, CDU/CSU, Bündnis 90/Die Grünen, and FDP. The reform introduces significant structural changes, including a collegial board of up to seven members instead of a single president, a reduction in the board size from 20 to 9, and greater financial autonomy for the foundation. Additionally, leadership positions will be temporary, and civil service appointments will be rare. Also, the foundation will not have the right to change its name independently, and mergers with private foundations, such as the “Humboldt Forum Foundation”, will require approval from both the cultural and budget committees of the Bundestag. The law is set to take effect on December 1, 2025.

== Buildings ==
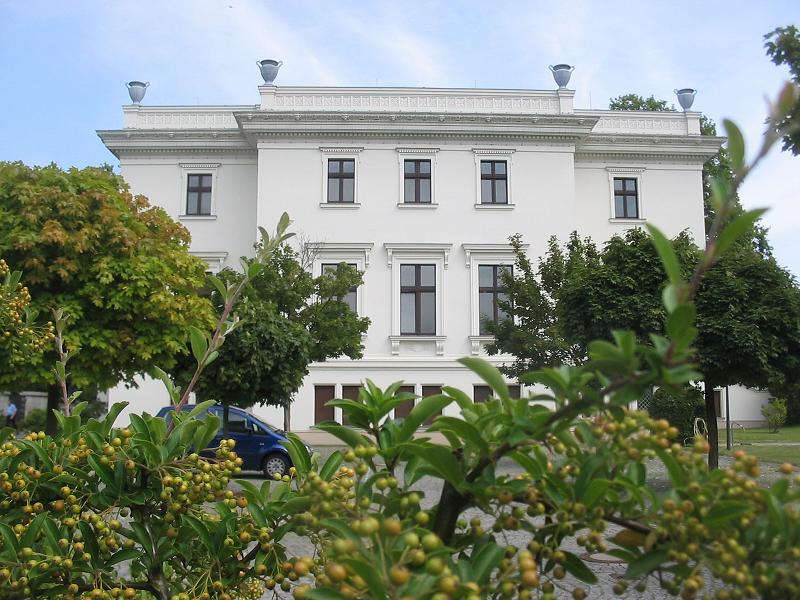
Domicile of the president and the administrative center in Berlin-Tiergarten

In 1980 the Foundation's headquarters moved into a historic building at Von-der-Heydt-Straße 16. The Villa Von Der Heydt was built between 1860 and 1862 in neo-Renaissance style by the architect Hermann Ende for Baron August von der Heydt, who was Minister of Finance under Otto von Bismarck in the last Prussian cabinet before the founding of the German Empire in 1871.

After Von der Heydt's death in 1874 the building became home to the first Chinese ambassador to Wilhelm II, who decorated its splendid rooms with valuable works of art. In 1938 the villa was bought by the Nazi government and used as an official residence by Hans Lammers, Cabinet Minister in the Reich Chancellery.

The house was severely damaged in World War II, with only the basement and the outer walls remaining. In the immediate post-war years it was occupied by a sweets factory and an illicit still. The villa's gloomy ruins also once formed the backdrop for a spy film. It was not until 1971 that plans for reconstruction of the building began under the aegis of the German Federal Buildings Authority. Renovations completed in 1980.

The Foundation has since expanded operations to a new office building at Von-der-Heydt-Straße 16.

== Institutions administered ==
The Heritage Foundation has overall responsibility for the following institutions and facilities:

- Berlin State Museums
  - Altes Museum
  - Alte Nationalgalerie
  - Bode-Museum
  - Ethnological Museum of Berlin
  - Friedrichswerder Church
  - Gemäldegalerie, Berlin
  - Hamburger Bahnhof
  - Kupferstichkabinett Berlin
  - Museum of Asian Art
  - Museum Berggruen
  - Museum of Decorative Arts
  - Museum Europäischer Kulturen
  - Museum of Photography
  - Museum Scharf-Gerstenberg
  - Neues Museum
  - Neue Nationalgalerie
  - Pergamon Museum
- Museum Agencies
  - Central Archive of the Berlin State Museums
    - Center for Provenance Research
  - Kunstbibliothek Berlin
  - Rathgen Research Laboratory
  - Replica Works (Gipsformerei)
- Berlin State Library
  - Haus Unter Den Linden
  - Haus Potsdamer Straße
  - Haus Westhafen
  - Prussian Heritage Image Archive
  - Coordination Office for the Preservation of the Written Cultural Heritage
- Prussian Privy State Archives
- Research Institutes
  - Ibero-American Institute
  - Institute for Museum Research
  - State Institute for Music Research
    - Berlin Musical Instrument Museum

== Awards ==
The foundation awards the annual Felix Mendelssohn Bartholdy Prize to the winner of a competition between the best students from Germany's conservatories. Each year a different instrument is chosen.

The Ernst Waldschmidt Prize is awarded every five years for academically valuable achievements in the field of Indology, in particular in the fields in which Waldschmidt himself specialized: Buddhism, Indian and Central Asian archaeology and art.

Since 2004, the Foundation sponsors positions for the Voluntary Social Year in Culture (German: Freiwillige Soziale Jahr in der Kultur or FSJ), a program of National Service for teenagers and young adults who meet certain educational requirements. There is a position each at the Directorate-General of the Berlin State Museums, Ibero-American Institute, Berlin State Library and the Central Archive of the Berlin State Museums.

The Heritage Foundation also awards scholarships for one- to three-month research and work residencies in Berlin. The scholarships are primarily intended to enable foreign scholars to work at the museums, libraries and archives and make professional contacts with staff.

Hermann Parzinger, President of the Prussian Cultural Heritage Foundation, co-chairs the German/American Provenance Research Exchange Program (PREP) for Museum Professionals for 2017–2019.

== List of presidents ==
- 1967–1977: Hans-Georg Wormit
- 1977–1998: Werner Knopp
- 1999–2008: Klaus-Dieter Lehmann
- Since 2008: Hermann Parzinger

== See also ==
- Humboldt Box
- Prussian Palaces and Gardens Foundation Berlin-Brandenburg
