= Köpenick Palace =

Château in Berlin, Germany

Coordinates: 52°26′38″N 13°34′22″E

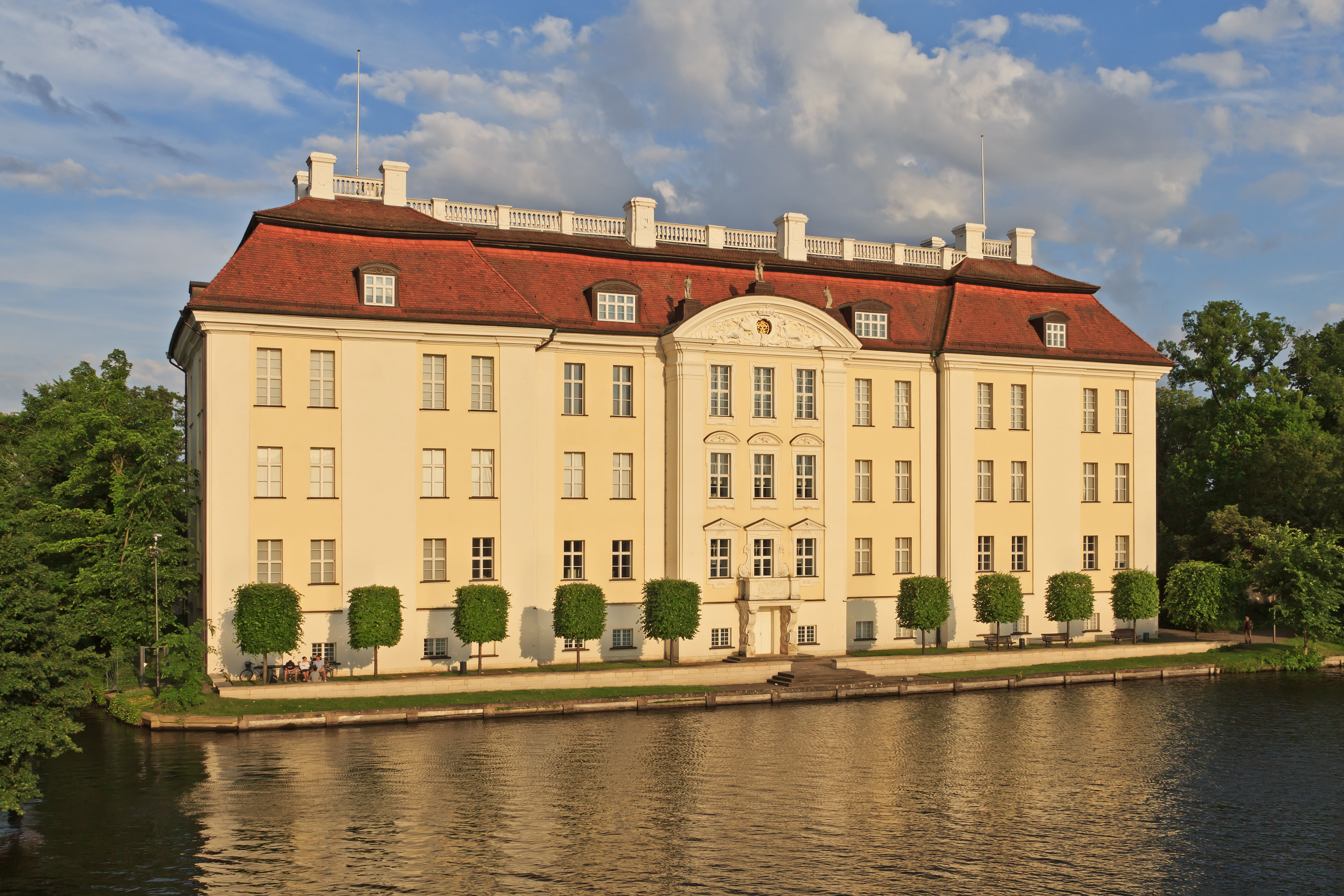
Köpenick Palace

Köpenick Palace, Berlin

Schloss Köpenick (English: Köpenick Palace) is a Baroque water palace of the Hohenzollern electors of Brandenburg which stands on an island in the Dahme River surrounded by an English-style park and gives its name to Köpenick, a district of Berlin.

The castle was originally built on the foundations of a Slavic castle (6th century) in 1558 as a hunting lodge by order of Elector Joachim II Hector of Brandenburg. The building in a Renaissance style was located on the river island at the site of the former medieval fort. Joachim II died here in 1571. In 1631 it served as the headquarters of King Gustavus Adolphus of Sweden, where he – without results – asked his brother-in-law Elector George William for assistance in the Thirty Years' War.

Frederick I of Prussia had the lodge rebuilt and enlarged from 1677 and lived here together with his first wife Elizabeth Henrietta of Hesse-Kassel. In 1730 Frederick II of Prussia, then Crown Prince, and his friend Hans Hermann von Katte faced the court-martial for desertion at Schloss Köpenick. Today the castle surrounded by a small park serves as the Museum of Decorative Arts, run by the Prussian Cultural Heritage Foundation as part of the Berlin State Museums.

Since 1963, Köpenick Palace has been used by the Kunstgewerbemuseum as an exhibition space. Being renovated in 2004, the palace accommodates museum of arts with the permanent exhibition "RoomArt", featuring the decorative arts of the Renaissance, Baroque and Rococo periods. The museum also presents the outstanding masterworks in interior design from the 16th to 18th centuries.
