= Coordination Office for the Preservation of Written Cultural Heritage =

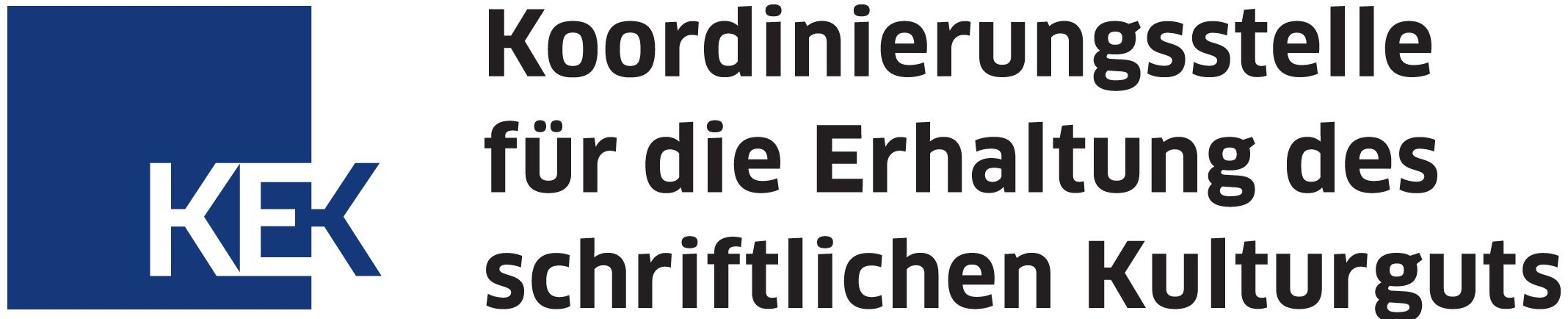
German logo of the Coordination Office

The Coordination Office for the Preservation of Written Cultural Heritage (KEK) supports, coordinates and optimises the preservation of original written materials in archives, libraries and museums. Its goal is to help safeguard the cultural memory of Germany.

== History ==
In the wake of the fire at the Duchess Anna Amalia Library in Weimar in 2004 and the collapse of the Historical Archive of the City of Cologne in 2009, the Coordination Office was founded in 2011 on the initiative of the then German Minister of State for Culture, Bernd Neumann. Established within the Prussian Cultural Heritage Foundation and based at the Berlin State Library, it is funded by the Federal Government Commissioner for Culture and the Media and the Cultural Foundation of the German Federal States.

== Tasks ==
The Coordination Office provides financial support, disseminates information and builds networks among archives, libraries and museums. As the sole interregional and interdisciplinary body operating in the field of preservation, it creates a platform for specialists, policymakers and institutions. It also raises awareness of preservation issues through print publications, national and international events, and digital content.

Since 2015, the theoretical and strategic foundation of these efforts has been the "National Recommendations for Action", the first comprehensive report on the state of written cultural heritage in Germany. In addition to taking stock of damage and threats, the paper lays out an overall concept for the preservation of written original materials.
