= Rathgen Research Laboratory =

German research laboratory

Coordinates: 52.518659°N 13.295511°E

Rathgen Laboratory Rathgen-Forschungslabor
- Established: April 1, 1888
- Field of research: Archeometry, Conservation Science, Materials Science, Forensic Science
- Director: Stefan Simon
- Location: Schloßstraße 1A, 14059 Berlin-Charlottenburg, Germany
- Affiliations: International Council on Monuments and Sites, International Council of Museums
- Operating agency: Berlin State Library
- Website: Rathgen-Forschungslabor

The Rathgen Research Laboratory (German: Rathgen-Forschungslabor) is a Research Institute of the Berlin State Museums under the auspices of the Prussian Cultural Heritage Foundation. It carries out cross-material conservation science, art technology and archaeometry studies of fine arts and cultural artifacts to determine composition, age and authenticity and provide advice on their restoration. It further conducts academic research on scientific issues concerning the care and preservation of monuments and archaeological sites. Founded in 1888 as the Chemical Laboratory of the Royal Museums in Berlin, it is the oldest museum laboratory in world and bears the name of its first director, Dr. Friedrich Rathgen.

The Laboratory also provides services to a number of international bodies, such as the International Council on Monuments and Sites (ICOMOS), the International Council of Museums (ICOM) and the International Centre for the Study of the Preservation and Restoration of Cultural Property (ICCROM).

== Facilities ==
The laboratory is equipped with state-of-the-art analytical equipment, methods and procedures, including:

- Environmental Scanning Electron Microscopy (ESEM)
- Energy-dispersive X-ray spectroscopy (EDS)
- X-ray fluorescence and Micro-X-ray fluorescence (μ-XRF and XRF)
- X-ray diffraction analysis (XRD)
- Infrared (FT-IR) and UV spectroscopy (UV-Vis)
- Gas chromatography–mass spectrometry (GC-MS)
- High performance liquid chromatography (HPLC)
- Atomic absorption spectroscopy (AAS)

Other methods for the investigation of materials include a weathering chamber to simulate environmental conditions and mobile measuring systems for monitoring the physical and chemical environment for art works in situ.

== Achievements ==
The Rathgen has exposed several scandalous forgeries, including paintings in the Beltracchi affair. Analysis of annular rings in the original frames demonstrated that the wood was indeed old but came from trees that had once stood tightly side by side, unlikely for diverse works such as Fernand Léger and Max Ernst.

== See also ==
- Friedrich Rathgen
- Berlin State Museums
- Institute for Museum Research
- Prussian Cultural Heritage Foundation
