= Zentralarchiv der Staatlichen Museen zu Berlin =

Archive in Berlin

Coordinates: 52.520765°N 13.397259°E

The Zentralarchiv der Staatlichen Museen zu Berlin (Central Archive of the Berlin State Museums) is an academic institution in Berlin, Germany, linked with the collections and administrative departments of the Staatliche Museen zu Berlin. It functions as the primary site for research and preservation of the museums' "memory" and their primary source documents. Its holdings span the history of the Staatliche Museen of today back to the former Königliche Museen (Royal Museums) of the Kingdom of Prussia and German Empire. Through consolidation, the holdings have become one of the most important art history archives in Germany.

The Zentralarchiv's mission is to handle these materials according to archive-specific principles, to ensure long-term preservation and to make them accessible. In response to increased demand for information and documentation about the history of the museums' collections, a location on Museum Island is open to the public, offering holdings of the archive for researchers as well as answering queries.

== History ==
A formal archive for collecting and managing the records of the Royal, later the National Museums in Berlin was established in 1960 at the Pergamon Museum, then located in East Berlin. In 1965 another archive was established at the Alte Nationalgalerie as a documentation facility in the field of art history. It collected information on 19th- and 20th-century art and even the so-called "degenerate art". In the mid-1980s, a Bauarchiv der Staatlichen Museen (Building Archive of the State Museums) was established, which collected the construction documents of each building. In 1987, these three archives were merged to become the Zentralarchiv. Following German reunification, the archives became part of the Staatliche Museen zu Berlin under the auspices of the Prussian Cultural Heritage Foundation.

In spring 2004 the Werner Kittel Archive, one if the most comprehensive art history archives in Germany, was transferred to the Zentralarchiv. It holds archival material on over 450,000 artists.

== Collection ==
The archive is divided into the following sections:

- Transaction records of the Königliche Museen and Staatliche Museen in Berlin up to 1945
- Transaction records of the Staatliche Museen after 1945 and those of the Prussian Cultural Heritage Foundation after 1948/1957
- Records of associations and commissions
- Personal papers of museum staff, including depositions
- Archived collections
