= Staatliche Museen zu Berlin =

Group of museums in Berlin, Germany

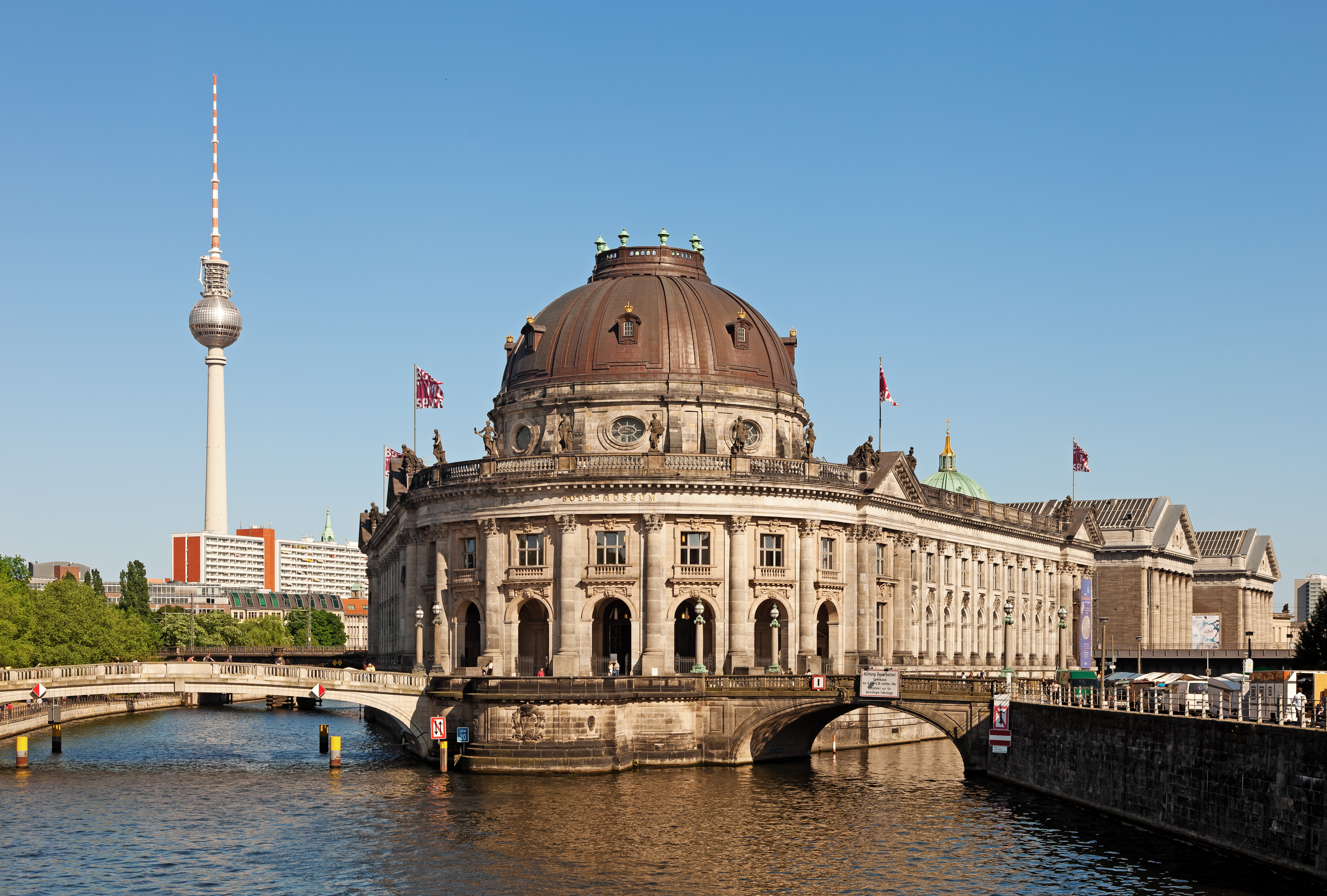
- The Bode Museum on Museum Island
- Former name: Königliche Museen (Royal Museums)
- Established: 1823
- Location: Berlin, Germany
- Coordinates: 52°30′24″N 13°21′19″E
- Website: smb.museum

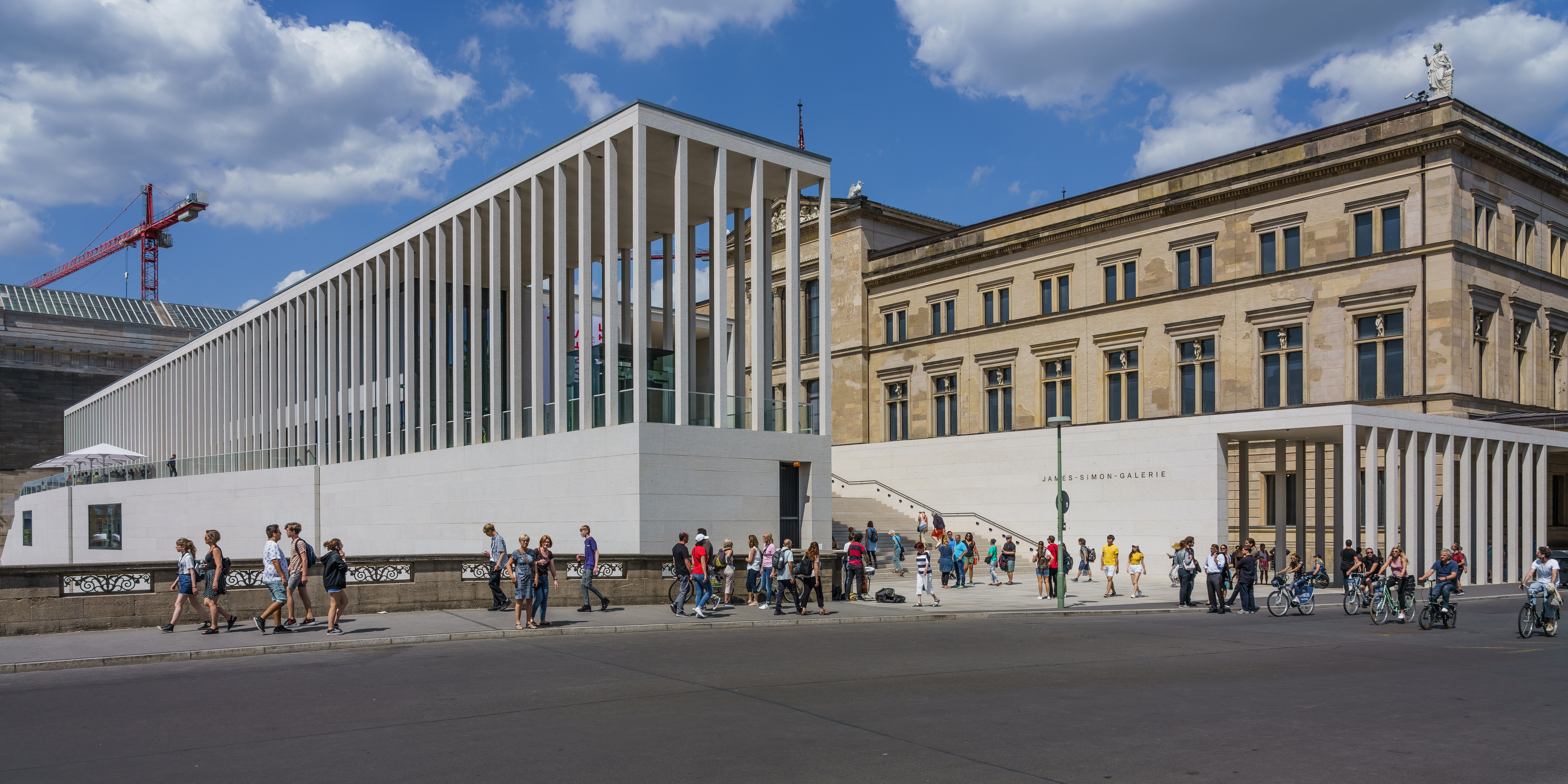
James Simon Gallery on Museum Island, with the Neues Museum behind

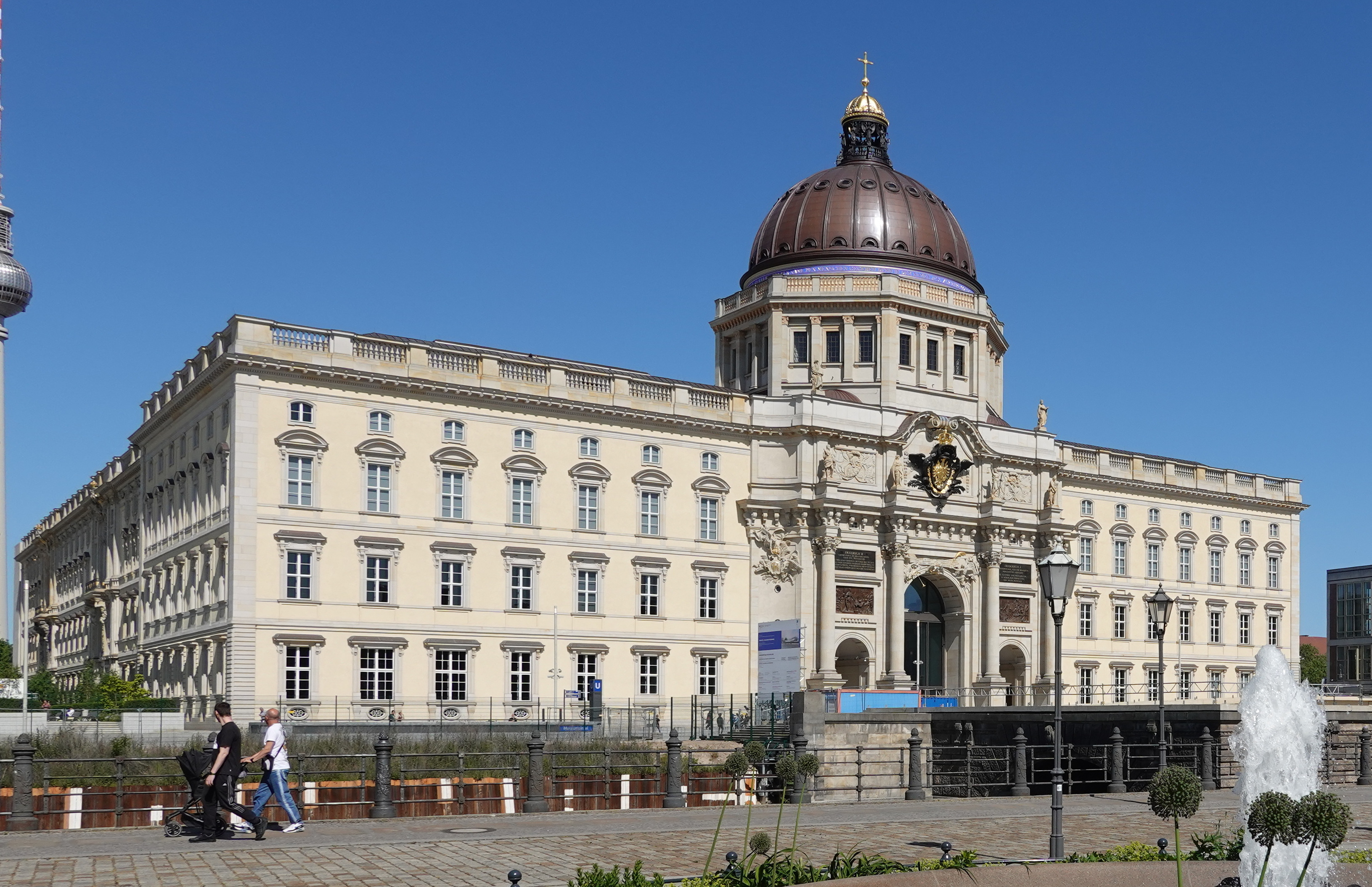
Humboldt Forum

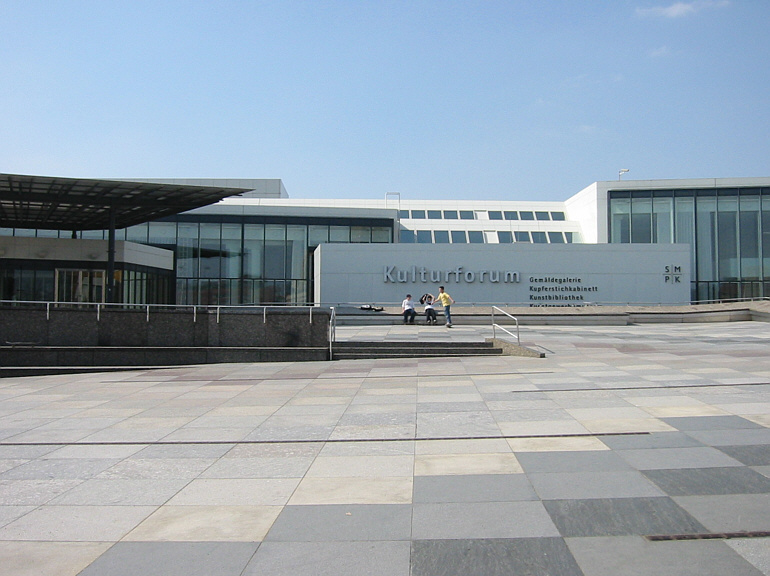
Kulturforum

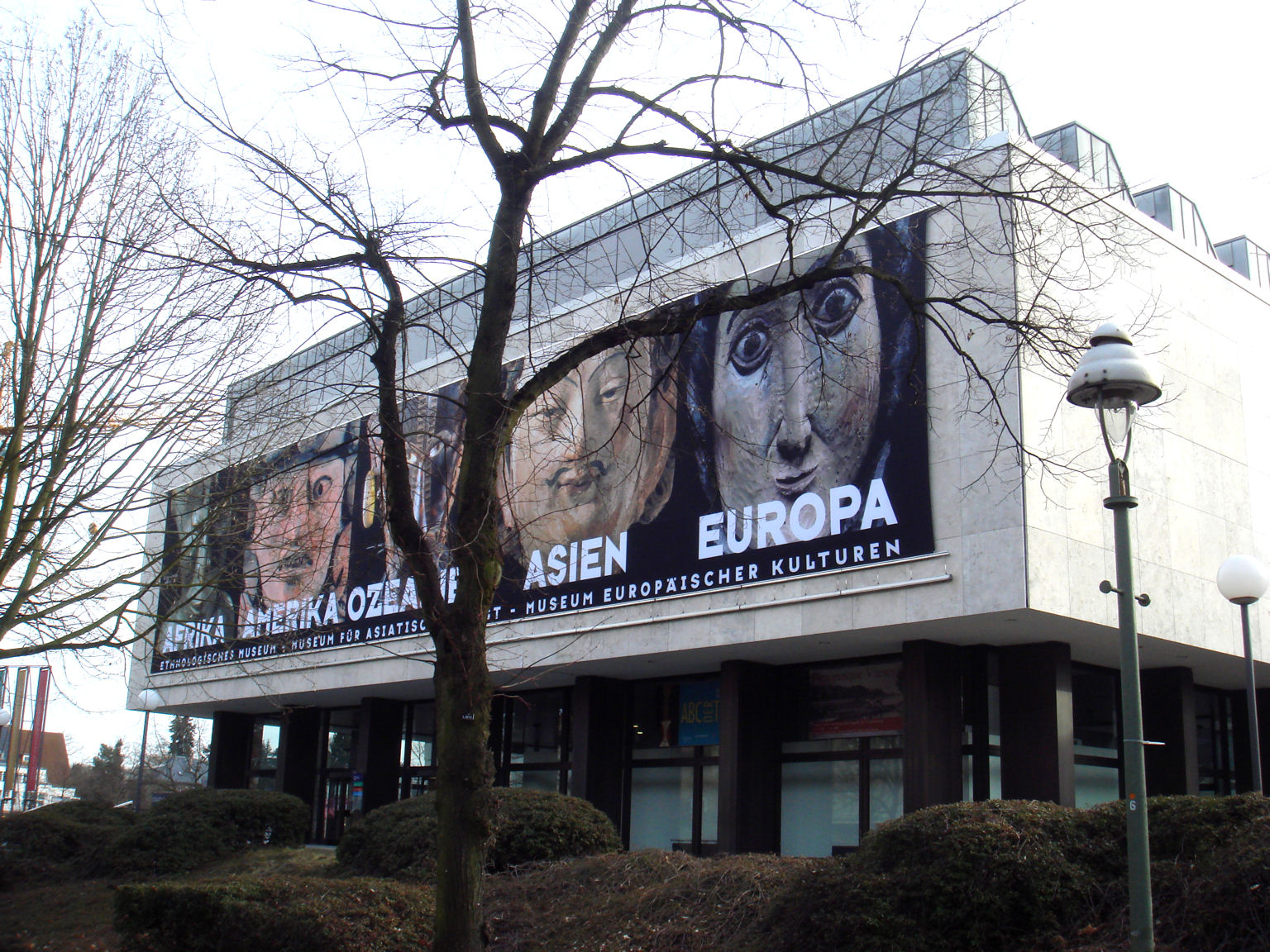
Dahlem Museums

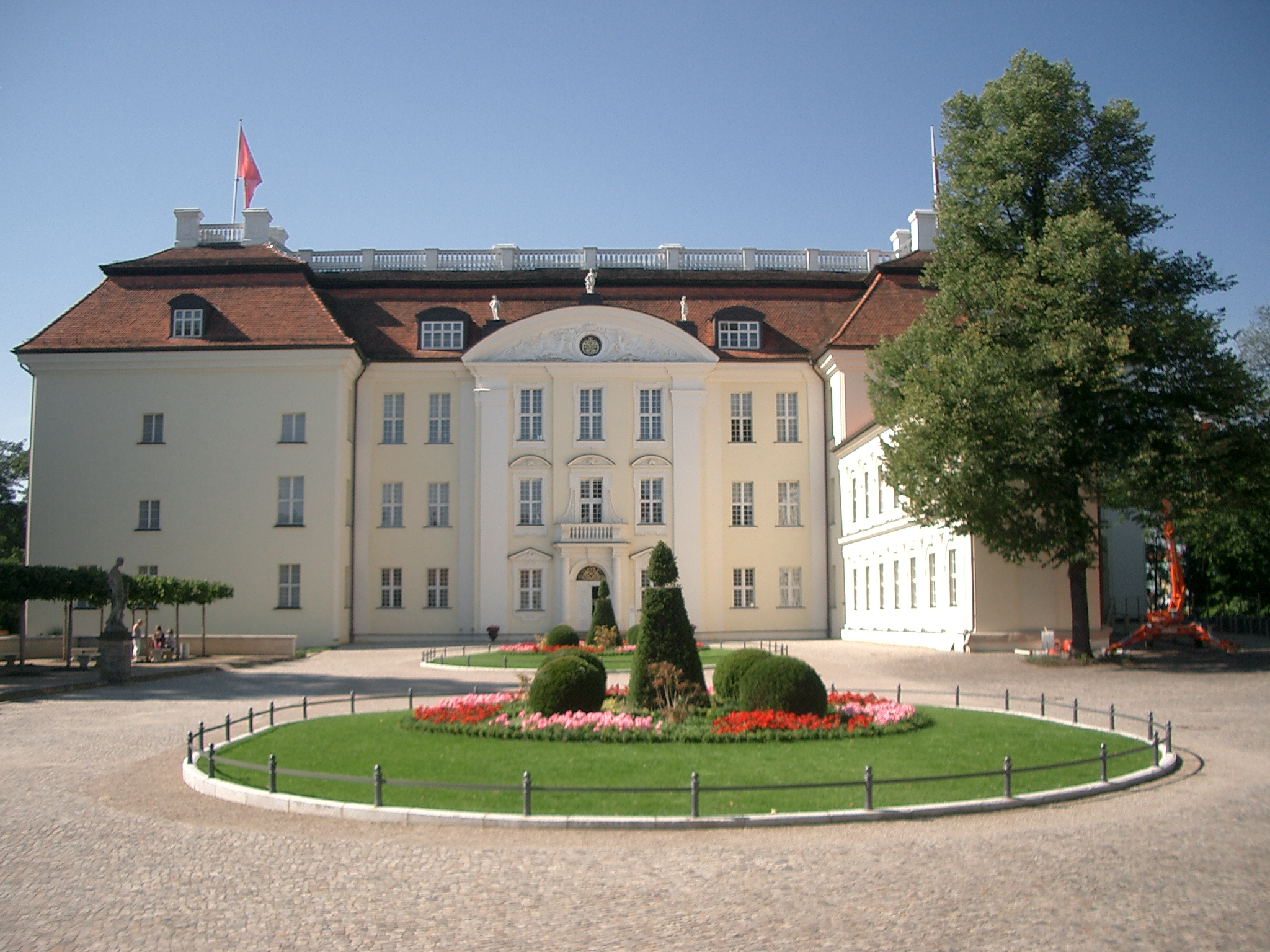
Köpenick Palace

The Staatliche Museen zu Berlin (Berlin State Museums) are a group of institutions in Berlin, Germany, comprising seventeen museums in five clusters; several research institutes; libraries; and supporting facilities. They are overseen by the Prussian Cultural Heritage Foundation and funded by the German federal government in collaboration with Germany's federal states. The central complex on Museum Island was added to the UNESCO list of World Heritage Sites in 1999. By 2007, the Staatliche Museen zu Berlin had grown into the largest complex of museums in Europe. The museum was originally founded by King Friedrich Wilhelm III of Prussia in 1823 as the Königliche Museen (Royal Museums).

The director-general of the Staatliche Museen zu Berlin is Floretine Dietrich.

== Museum locations ==
=== Mitte ===
- Museum Island
  - Altes Museum: Greek and Roman Classical antiquities
  - Alte Nationalgalerie: 19th-century sculptures and paintings
  - Bode Museum: the Numismatic Collection, Sculpture Collection and the Museum of Byzantine Art
  - James Simon Gallery: reception building for the complex
  - Neues Museum: the Egyptian Museum of Berlin and its Papyrus Collection, and the Museum für Vor- und Frühgeschichte (Museum of Prehistory and Early History)
  - Pergamon Museum: the Antikensammlung, Museum of Islamic Art, Vorderasiatisches Museum (Museum of the Ancient Near East) and Zentralarchiv (Central Archive)
- Friedrichswerder Church: early 19th-century sculptures
- Humboldt Forum
  - Ethnological Museum: American archaeology, music ethnology, North American Indians, South Sea, East Asia, Africa, Junior Museum
  - Museum of Asian Art: Collection of South, Southeast and Central Asian Art; Collection of East Asian Art

=== Tiergarten/Moabit ===
- Kulturforum
  - Gemäldegalerie: Old Master paintings
  - Kunstgewerbemuseum: Museum of decorative art
  - Kupferstichkabinett: Drawings and print room
  - Kunstbibliothek: Art Library
  - Neue Nationalgalerie: New National Gallery
- Hamburger Bahnhof: Museum for contemporary art, including the Flick Collection

=== Charlottenburg ===
- Museum Berggruen: Classic modern art
- Museum of Photography / Helmut Newton Foundation
- Museum Scharf-Gerstenberg: Surrealist art
- Gipsformerei (Replica workshop)

=== Dahlem ===
- Museum Europäischer Kulturen: European cultures

=== Berlin State Library ===
- Two locations, Haus Unter den Linden and Haus Potsdamer Straße, are open to the public; various others are not.

== Research institutes ==
- Institute for Museum Research, Dahlem
- Rathgen Research Laboratory, Charlottenburg
- Zentralarchiv der Staatlichen Museen zu Berlin, Mitte

== See also ==
- List of museums in Berlin
