= Friedrich Rathgen =

German chemist (1862–1942)

Friedrich Wilhelm Rathgen (2 June 1862 – 19 November 1942) was a German chemist and a founder of the field of conservation science.

== Biography ==
Rathgen was born in Eckernförde, Schleswig-Holstein, then part of Denmark, on 2 June 1862. He began his formal education at the University of Göttingen in 1881, where he studied the natural sciences. After a brief period of study in Berlin, Rathgen completed his education at the University of Marburg, where he received his doctoral degree in organic chemistry in 1886 (Rathgen 1886). The following year Rathgen served as a research assistant to the German chemist, H. H. Landholt, in Berlin, where he worked on various aspects of sugar polarization. In 1888 Rathgen was appointed the first director of the newly formed chemical laboratory of the Royal Museums of Berlin where he remained until his retirement in 1927

Rathgen is significant in the early development of art conservation, particularly for archaeological conservation. Firstly he was the first chemist to be employed by a museum, the Koniglichen Museen, Berlin (Royal Museums of Berlin), in 1888. This was an event important enough for Chris Caple (2000 P.53) to write: "It was, perhaps, only in 1888 that conservation as a profession discipline can truly be seen to have started". This helped in establishing the birth of conservation science.

His second major contribution was to publish a Handbook of Conservation. "In 1898 Rathgen published the first edition of his handbook Die Konservierung von Altertumsfunden (The Conservation of Antiquities) (Rathgen, 1898). This was the first comprehensive treatment of the subject; it drew upon his ten years of experience and practical work in the field". It was translated into English in 1905 (Rathgen 1905). Prior to this there had been several short works, including works by Rathgen, published about conservation, but nothing devoted purely to the subject.

Rathgen's handbook was divided into two parts, a format which was adhered to in all subsequent editions:

- Part I was devoted to the transformations which antiquities undergo before and after excavation.
- Part II discussed the treatment of antiquities, with examples of methods used in various European museums, e.g. at the Royal Museums of Berlin.

Many of the methods employed today for the treatment of archaeological materials may be found here in one form or another although Rathgen is rarely cited as a source of reference.

== Legacy ==
The Rathgen Research Laboratory, bearing Rathgen's name, carries forward the tradition of the old Chemical Laboratory of the Royal Museums in Berlin and is today the world's oldest scientific museum laboratory. It has become a leading institution for conservation science, art technology and archaeometry. The laboratory carries out investigations on a broad variety of materials within the museum environment and conducts research on the preservation of monuments and archaeological sites.

== Publications ==
Some of Rathgen's key publications:

- Rathgen, F. Über p- und o-Toluolazo-a- und b-napthol und die isomeren Hydrazinverbindungen. Ph.D. Diss., University of Marburg, Marburg, 1886.
- Rathgen, F. Die Konservierung von Altertumsfunden. Berlin: W. Spemann, 1898.
- Rathgen, F., and Borrman, R. Die Konservierung von Altertumsfunden. Nachtrag. Berlin: Georg Reimer, 1905.
- Rathgen, F., and Borrman, R. The Preservation of Antiquities: A Handbook for Curators. G. Auden and H. Auden, trans. London: Cambridge University Press, 1905.
