= Museum of Photography, Berlin =

Museum in Charlottenburg, Berlin, Germany

Coordinates: 52°30′28″N 13°19′54″E

Museum of Photography
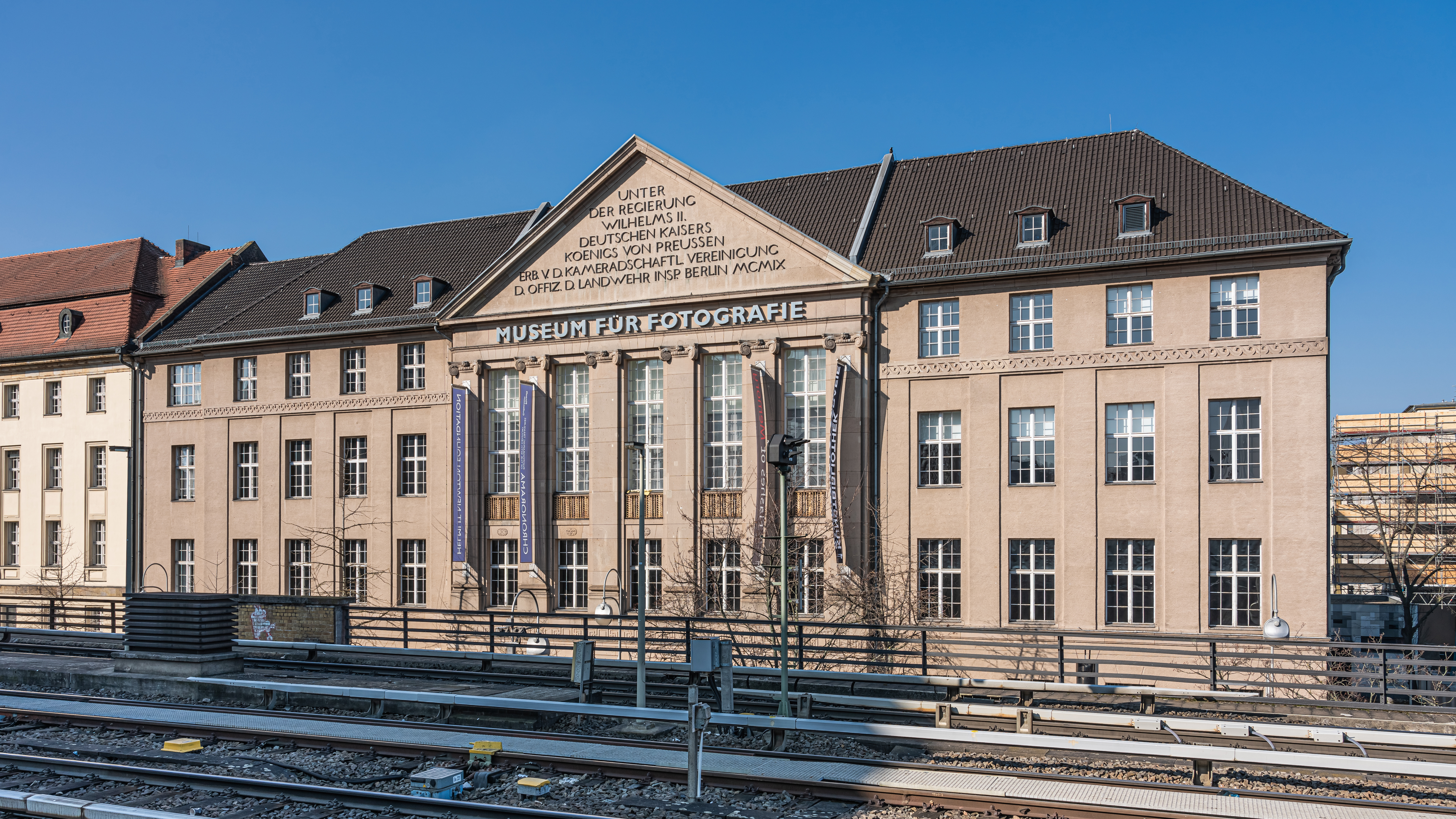
- Established: 2004
- Location: Jebensstraße 2, 10623 Berlin, Germany
- Website: www.smb.museum/en/

The Museum of Photography (German: Museum für Fotografie) in the Charlottenburg district of Berlin, Germany, is one of the Berlin State Museums administered by the Prussian Cultural Heritage Foundation.

It is located next to the Zoologischer Garten railway station in the building of a former Landwehr officers' mess, erected in 1909 according to plans by Heino Schmieden. The museum opened in 2004 and also houses the collection of the Helmut Newton Foundation. In addition to the rotating special exhibits, the permanent exhibit "Helmut Newton's Private Property" displays some of the late photographers' personal articles.
