= Hermann Parzinger =

German historian

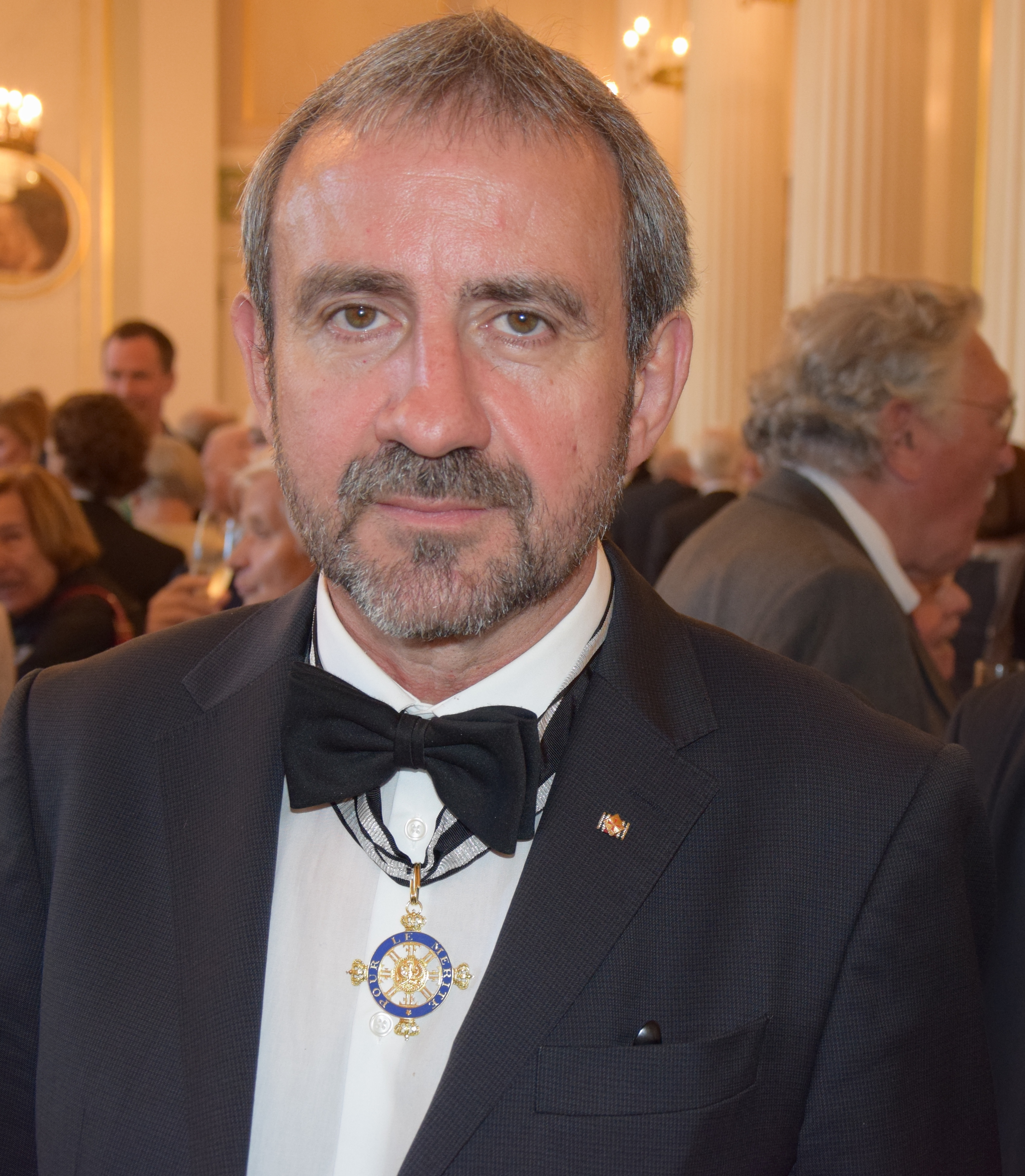
Hermann Parzinger

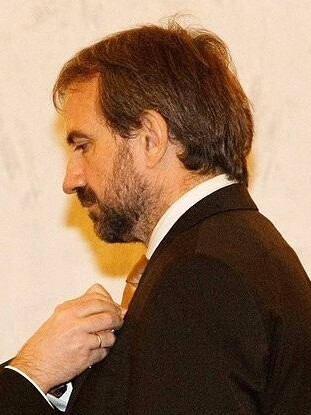
Hermann Parzinger

Hermann Parzinger is a German historian who is a specialist in the culture of the Scythians. He has been president of the Prussian Cultural Heritage Foundation between 1 March 2008 and 27 May 2025 and the Executive President of Europa Nostra since 2018.

== Life ==
After studying at LMU Munich, Saarland University, and the University of Ljubljana, he earned his doctorate and habilitation at LMU Munich. He first worked as a university assistant, then became Deputy Director of the Romano‑Germanic Commission and, in 1995, Founding Director of the Eurasia Department of the German Archaeological Institute. In 2003, he assumed the presidency of the DAI, and from 2008 to 2025 he headed the Prussian Cultural Heritage Foundation. In parallel, he was active in numerous scholarly academies and committees and shaped German cultural and science policy for decades.

== Research and Projects ==
Parzinger’s scholarly work encompasses an exceptionally broad spectrum of archaeological cultures and periods.

=== Scythian Research ===
He gained international recognition through the discovery of the Scythian princely tomb of Aržan (Tuva) with around 6,000 gold objects, as well as through the recovery of a tattooed ice mummy in the Altai.

=== Eurasian Early Cultures ===
Excavations in Spain (Castro Soto de Bureba), Turkey (Aşağı Pınar), Iran (Arisman), Kazakhstan (Bajkara) and Russia (Yenisei region). Interdisciplinary large‑scale projects – including a Volkswagen Foundation project on early tin extraction in Central Asia and paleogenetic studies on the mobility of Eurasian mounted nomads.

=== Science and Cultural Management ===
Parzinger is among the defining figures of the German cultural sector, also through his involvement in the Excellence Cluster Topoi, the founding directorship of the Humboldt Forum, and numerous international collaborations that significantly influenced the research and communication of early historical cultures.

=== Restitution of Human Skulls from Colonial Contexts ===
Parzinger, as President of the Stiftung Preußischer Kulturbesitz, made provenance research on human remains a central priority. The project investigating around 1,100 skulls from the former colony German East Africa is considered a milestone. Parzinger publicly emphasized the willingness to immediately return the remains to the countries of origin and made the results transparently available. International cooperation — The collaboration with Rwandan experts was praised as a “great success” and is regarded as a model for future restitution processes. As important as Parzinger’s initiatives were, the project also clearly revealed structural shortcomings. Leadership rested with the archaeologist Bernhard Heeb, who was responsible as curator for the anthropological collection.

== Honours and awards ==
- Since 1996 honorary professor at the Institute of Prehistoric Archaeology of the Freie Universität Berlin
- 1998 Leibniz Prize (highest endowed German research, which for the first time went to an archaeologist).
- Numerous scientific honors, including the honorary doctorates of the Siberian Branch of the Russian Academy of Sciences in Novosibirsk and the Russian Academy of Sciences in Moscow and honorary diplomas of the Republic of Tuva and the Mongolian Academy of Sciences.
- Honorary member of the Archaeological Institute of the Romanian Academy of Sciences in Iasi.
- In 2008, Parzinger was made an honorary citizen of his hometown Germering.
- On November 4, 2009, Parzinger was awarded the Order of Friendship, the highest Russian award for foreign citizens. He was also awarded in the German-Russian scientific and cultural relations that lead him for decades regularly to Russia for his outstanding scientific achievements and its multiple commitments.
- 2011 awarded the Heidelberg Academy of Sciences Hermann Parzinger the Reuchlin Prize of the city of Pforzheim (named after the humanist Johannes Reuchlin, who was born in 1455 in Pforzheim). The Heidelberg Academy justified this choice, among other things, that Parzinger have opened up with his time and transnational approach to research new territory for archeology and strengthened the importance of the humanities in the public consciousness.
- On 29 May 2011, the Chapter of the Order Pour le Mérite for Sciences and Arts added Parzinger to its domestic members.
- On 4 October 2012, Parzinger received Knights Commander of the Order of Merit of the Federal Republic of Germany
- 2013, Parzinger of the Academy of Sciences and Literature in Mainz the first ever Kalkhof-Rose Academy Award.
- 2013 Parzinger was a member of the American Philosophical Society elected, the oldest learned society of the United States. Thus, the company pays a special tribute that he initiated in cooperation with Russian archaeologists and his extensive publication record and his outstanding work as a cultural manager.
- 2014 he was elected Honorary Member of the American Academy of Arts and Sciences.
- On 14 September 2015, Parzinger was awarded the Order of Merit of the Italian Republic (Ordine al Merito della Repubblica Italiana – OMRI) Award.
- 2016 Parzinger was named co-chair of the German/American Provenance Research Exchange Program (PREP) for Museum Professionals for 2017–2019 which aims to educate provenance researchers through exchanges, workshops and tours.
- 3 November 2017, Knight Grand Cross of the Civil Order of Alfonso X, the Wise

== Selected publications ==
- Chronologie der Späthallstatt- und Frühlatene-Zeit. Studien zu Fundgruppen zwischen Mosel und Save. Weinheim 1988. ISBN 3-527-17533-4 (Quellen und Forschungen zur prähistorischen und provinzialrömischen Archäologie Bd. 4)
- mit Rosa Sanz: Die Oberstadt von Hattuşa. Hethitische Keramik aus dem zentralen Tempelviertel. Funde aus den Grabungen 1982–1987. Berlin 1992. ISBN 3-7861-1656-3 (Boğazköy-Hattuşa Bd. 15)
- Studien zur Chronologie und Kulturgeschichte der Jungstein-, Kupfer- und Frühbronzezeit zwischen Karpaten und Mittlerem Taurus. Zabern, Mainz 1993. ISBN 3-8053-1501-5 (Römisch-Germanische Forschungen Bd. 52)
- Der Goldberg. Die Metallzeitliche Besiedlung. Zabern, Mainz 1998. ISBN 3-8053-2463-4 (Römisch-Germanische Forschungen Bd. 57)
- mit Rosa Sanz: Das Castro von Soto de Bureba. Archäologische und historische Forschungen zur Bureba in vorrömischer und römischer Zeit. Rahden/Westf. 2000. ISBN 3-89646-014-5.
- mit Viktor Zajbert, Anatoli Nagler, Alexander Plesakov: Der große Kurgan von Bajkara. Studien zu einem skythischen Heiligtum. Zabern, Mainz 2003. ISBN 3-8053-3273-4 (Archäologie in Eurasien Bd. 16)
- mit Necmi Karul, Zeynep Eres, Mehmet Özdoğan: Aşağı Pınar I. Zabern, Mainz 2003. (Archäologie in Eurasien Bd. 15 / Studien im Thrakien-Marmara-Raum Bd. 1)
- mit Nikolaus Boroffka: Das Zinn der Bronzezeit in Mittelasien I. Die siedlungsarchäologischen Forschungen im Umfeld der Zinnlagerstätten (Archäologie in Iran und Turan Bd. 5), Zabern, Mainz 2003, ISBN 3-8053-3135-5; ausführliche Rezension von Sören Stark in Orientalistische Literaturzeitung Band 105, 2010, Heft 1, S. 97–104.
- Die Skythen. Beck'sche Reihe 2342, München 2004. ISBN 3-406-50842-1.
- mit Heiner Schwarzberg: Aşağı Pınar II. Die mittel- und spätneolithische Keramik. Zabern, Mainz 2005. ISBN 3-8053-3541-5 (Archäologie in Eurasien Bd. 18 / Studien im Thrakien-Marmara-Raum Bd. 2)
- Die frühen Völker Eurasiens. Vom Neolithikum zum Mittelalter. Verlag C.H. Beck, München 2006. ISBN 3-406-54961-6.
- mit Wilfried Menghin, Manfred Nawroth und Anatoli Nagler (Hrsg.): Im Zeichen des Goldenen Greifen. Königsgräber der Skythen. Prestel Verlag, München 2007.
- mit Konstantin V. Tschugunov und Anatoli Nagler: Der Goldschatz von Arschan. Schirmer/Mosel, München 2006. ISBN 3-8296-0260-X.
- Gero von Merhart, Daljóko. Bilder aus sibirischen Arbeitstagen. Böhlau-Verlag, Wien, Köln, Weimar 2009.
- mit Thomas Flierl (Hrsg.): Humboldt-Forum Berlin. Das Projekt. Verlag Theater der Zeit, Berlin 2009.
- mit Konstantin V. Tschugunov und Anatoli Nagler: Der skythenzeitliche Fürstenkurgan von Arschan 2 in Tuva. Zabern, Mainz 2010. (Archäologie in Eurasien Bd. 26 / Steppenvölker Eurasiens Bd. 3)
- Die Kinder des Prometheus. Eine Geschichte der Menschheit vor der Erfindung der Schrift. 848 S. mit 110 Abbildungen und 19 Karten, größtenteils farbig. C. H. Beck Verlag München 2015, 4. Aufl. 2015 ISBN 978-3-406-66657-5.
