= Kunstgewerbemuseum Berlin =

Museum of Decorative Arts in Berlin, Germany

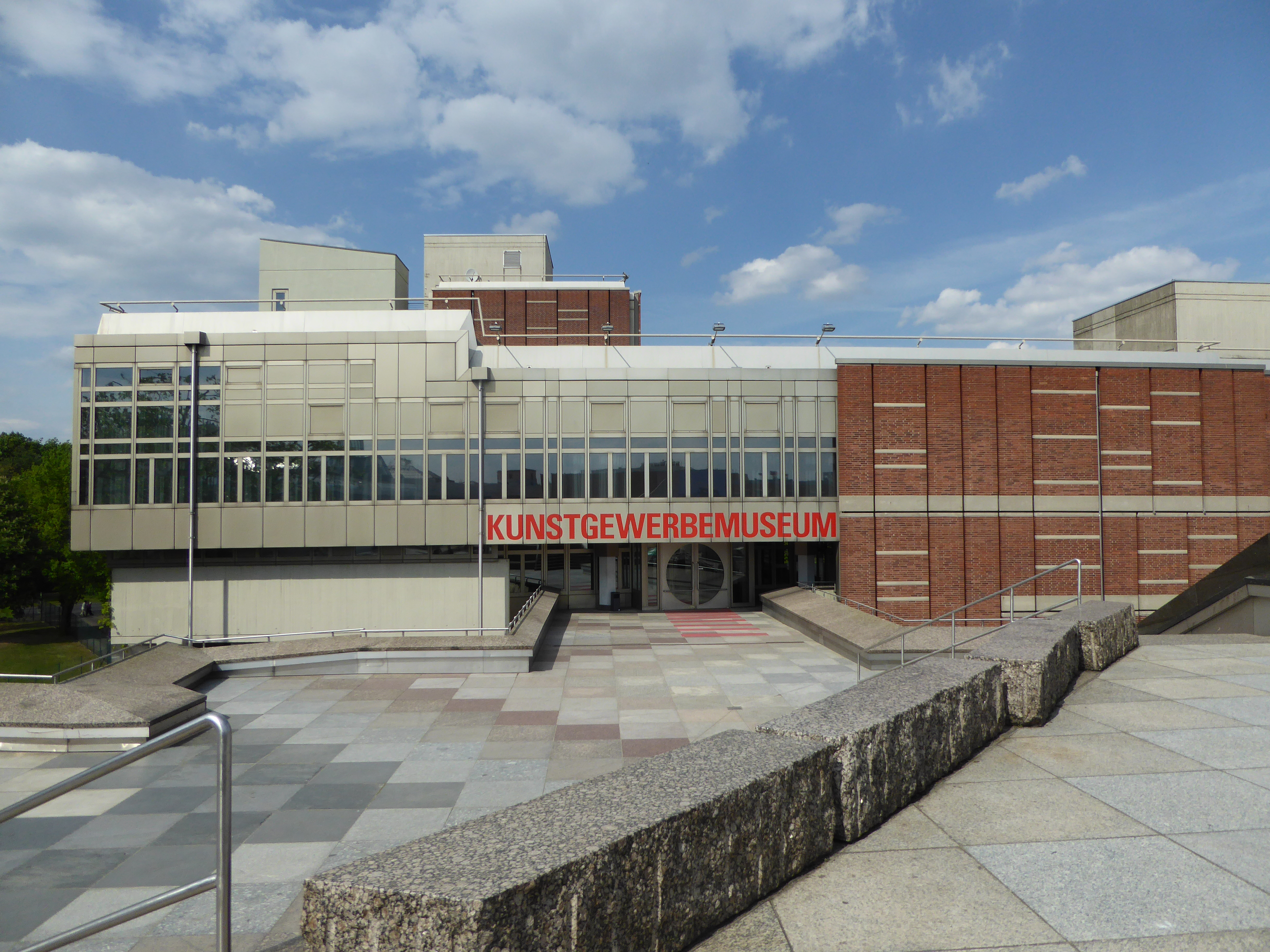
The entrance to the Kunstgewerbemuseum at the Kulturforum

Kunstgewerbemuseum Berlin, Berlin

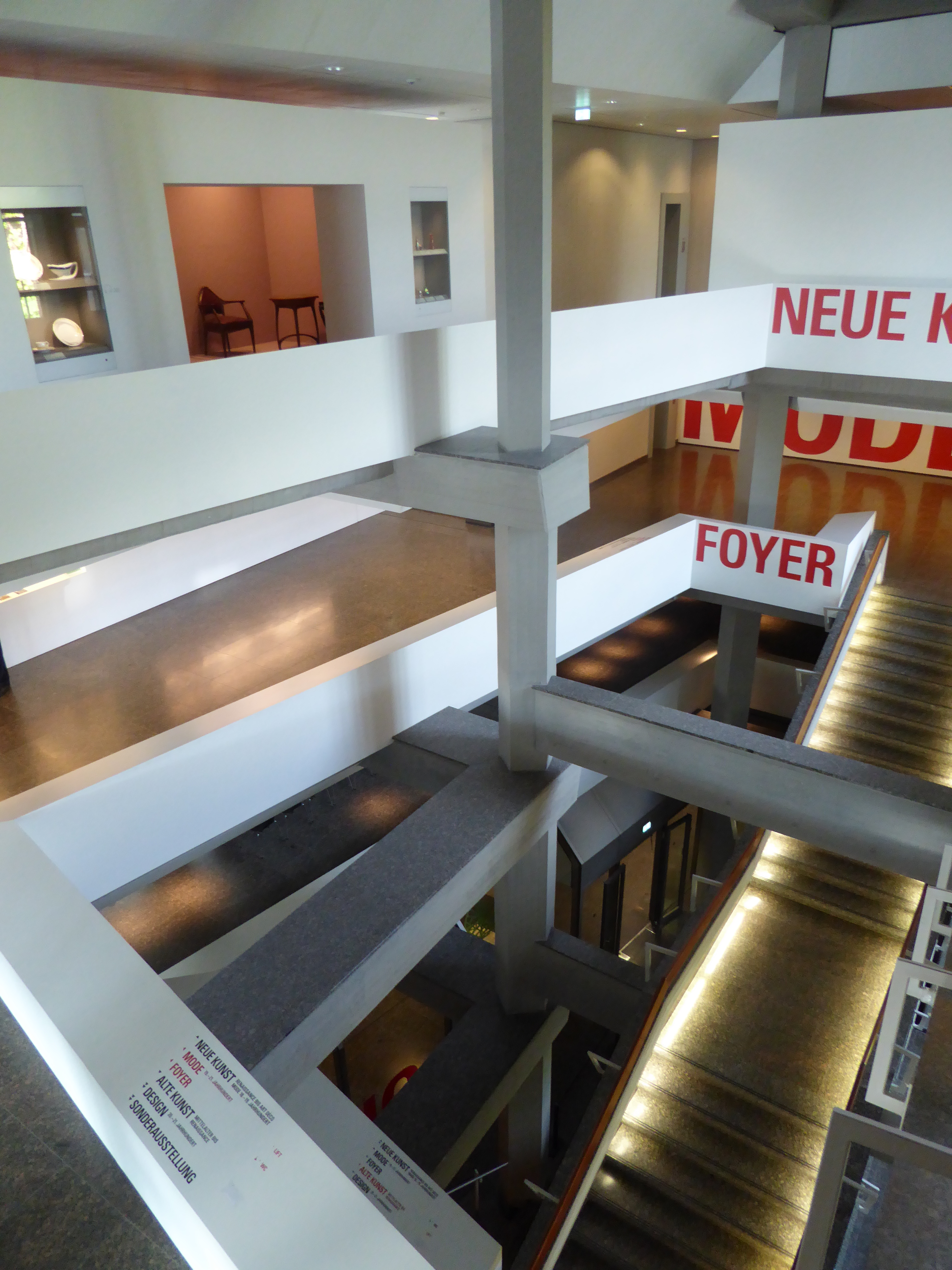
Inside the Kunstgewerbemuseum

The Kunstgewerbemuseum, or Museum of Decorative Arts, is an internationally important museum of the decorative arts in Berlin, Germany, part of the Staatliche Museen zu Berlin (Berlin State Museums). The collection is split between the Kunstgewerbemuseum building at the Kulturforum (52°30′35″N 13°22′03″E) and Köpenick Palace (52°26′38″N 13°34′22″E).

== History ==
It was founded in 1868 as the Deutsches Gewerbe-Museum zu Berlin, and originally had a teaching institute as well as a public museum. The collection grew significantly in the 1870s, and it was renamed Kunstgewerbemuseum in 1879. In 1881 it relocated into the Martin-Gropius-Bau – where Priam's Treasure was also on display for a time – and in 1921 it moved into the Stadtschloss.

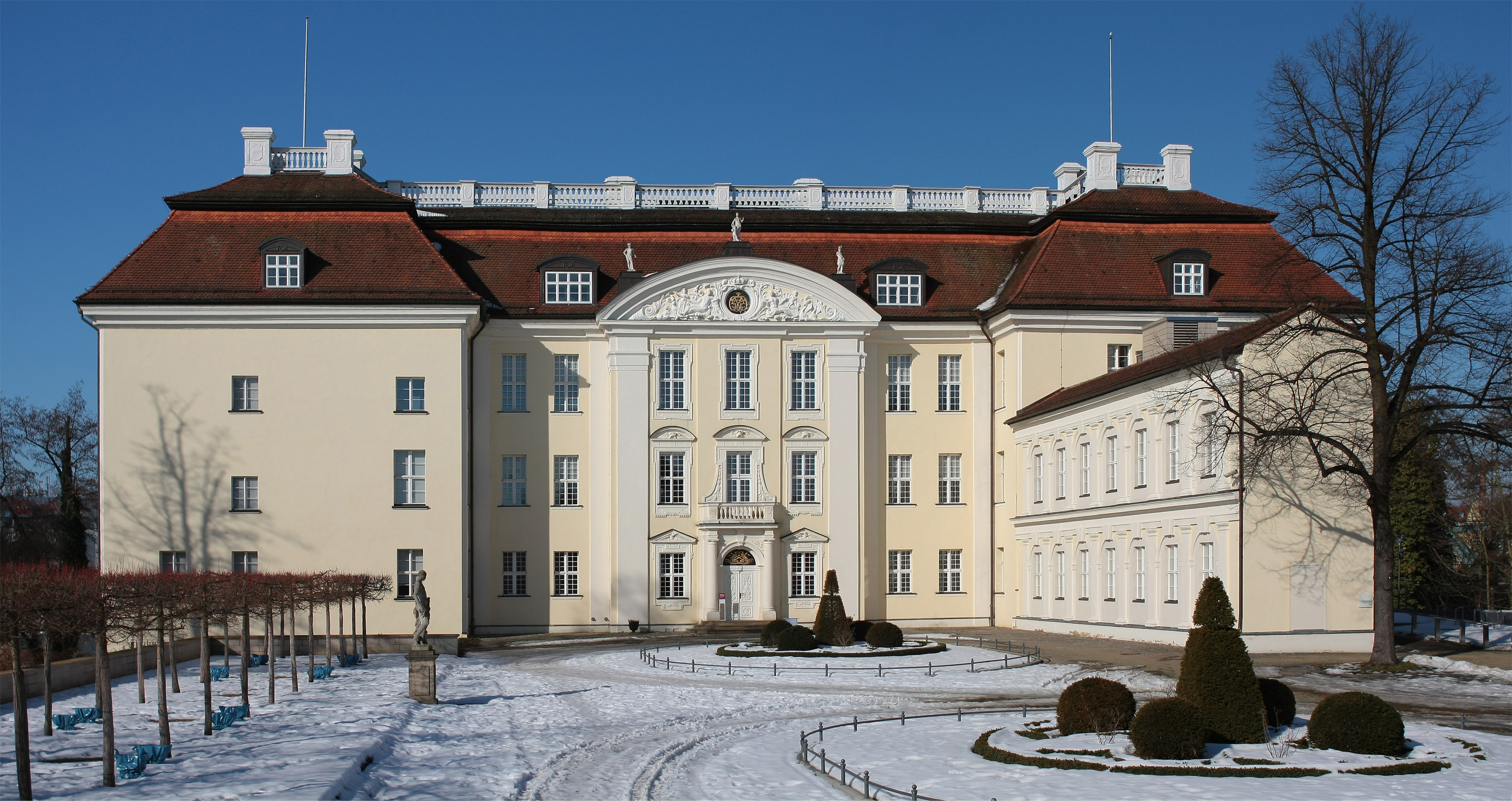
Köpenick palace

Parts of the collection were destroyed in World War II, and the surviving items were split between East and West Berlin. The Eastern collection moved into Köpenick Palace in 1963, while the Western exhibits moved first into Charlottenburg Palace, then into the new museum building in the Kulturforum in 1985, built by Rolf Gutbrod.

== Collection and exhibition ==
The museum houses a collection of decorative arts, including objects from the Middle Ages and the Renaissance. Decorative artifacts in Baroque and Rococo style are complemented by knick-knack in Jugendstil and Art Deco. The museum will only exhibit classic design. The museum occupies the Baroque palace of Köpenick and the Kulturforum which was completed in 1985.

There is a very important collection of Late Antique objects in many media. The items from the Middle Ages include a large number of gold reliquaries including the reliquary arm of St. Caesarius. The Renaissance is represented by silverware from the city councillors of Lüneburg, and bronze sculptures, tapestries, furniture, Venetian glasses and maiolicas from the Italian princely courts.

The Baroque era is represented by faiences from Delft, and glass items. There is also European porcelain, particularly from Meissen and the Royal Manufacturer of Berlin, and decorative crockery from the rococo, classicist, historicist and Art Nouveau styles. The "New Collection" of 20th century craftwork includes industrially-manufactured products.

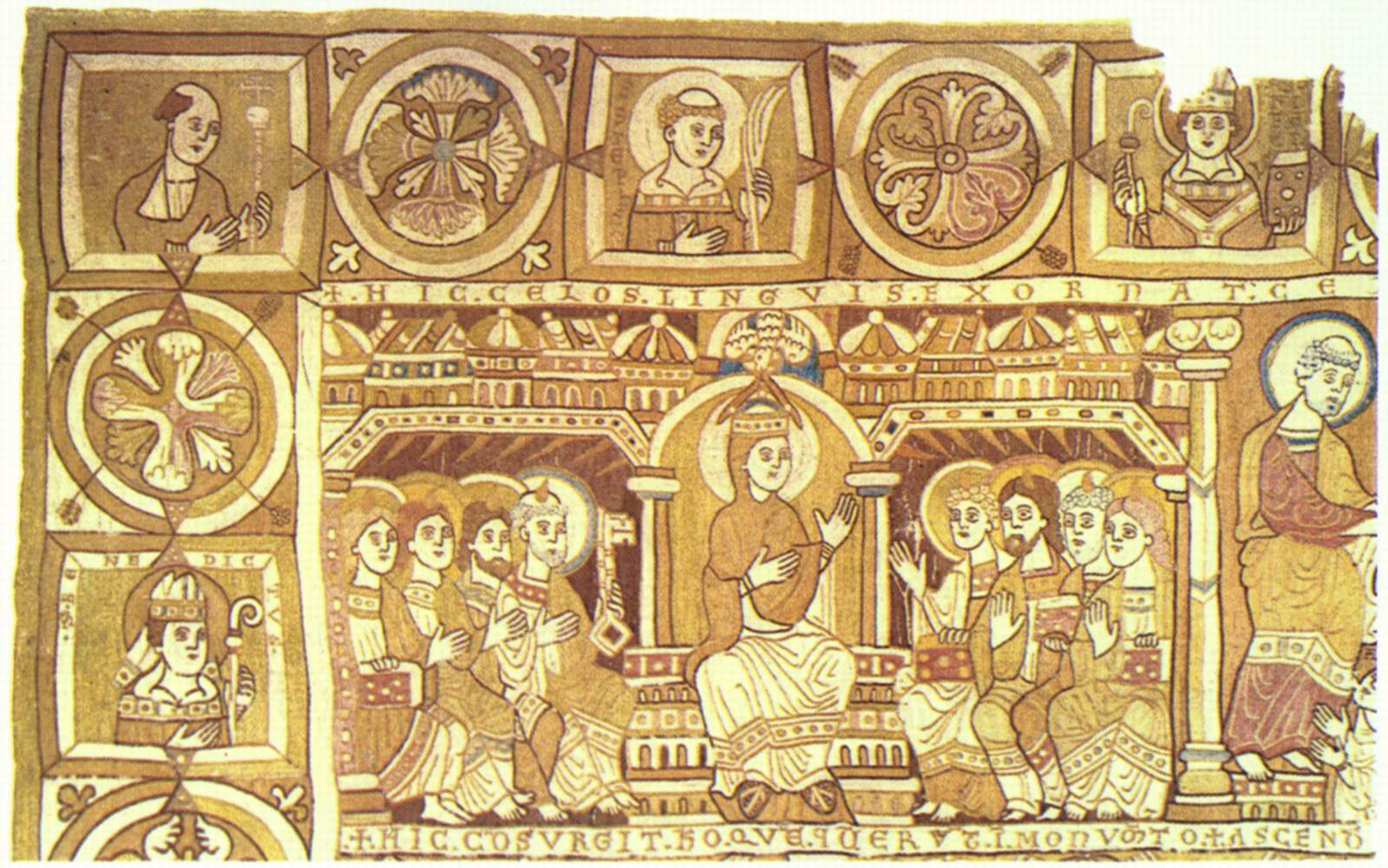
Fragment of an embroidered tapestry from Halberstadt, around 1170

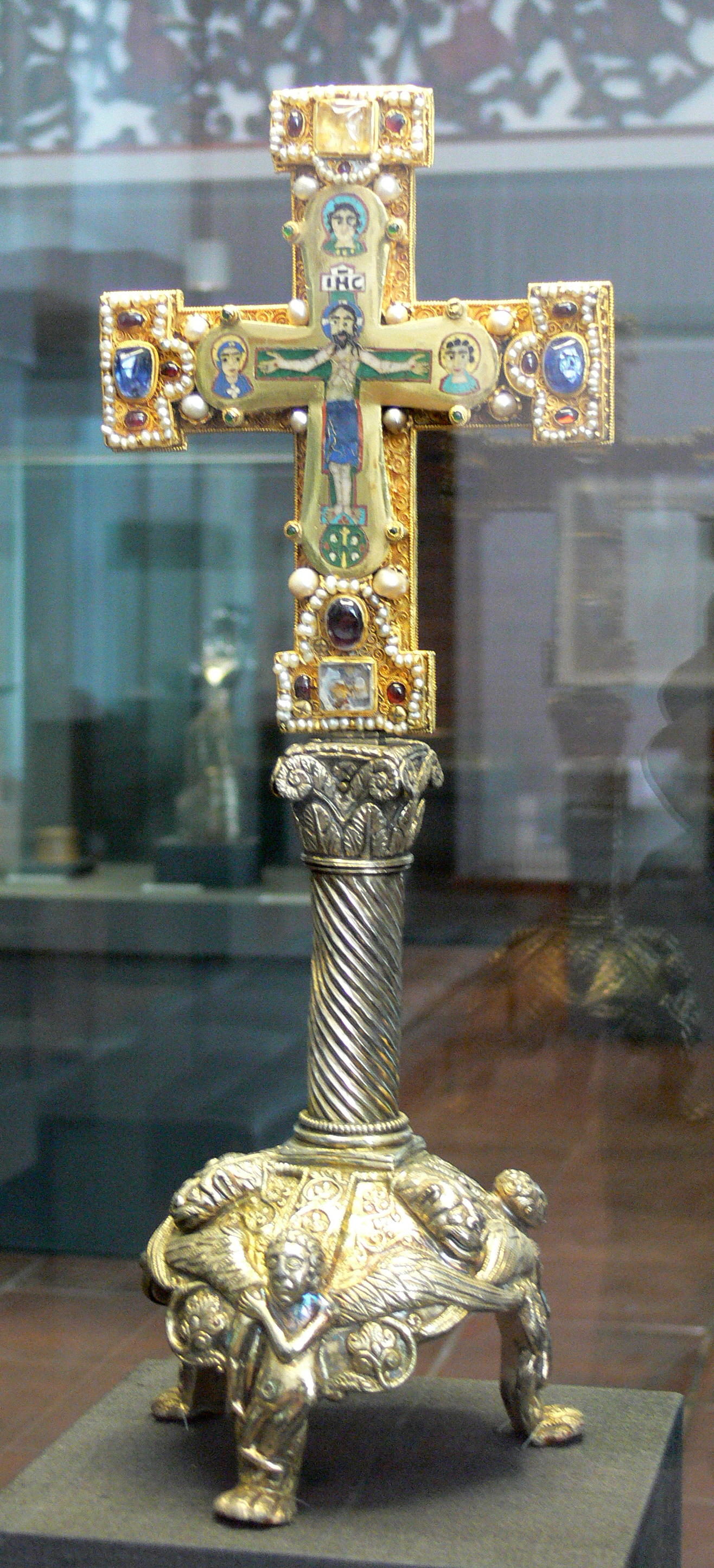
The Guelph Cross, first half 12th century

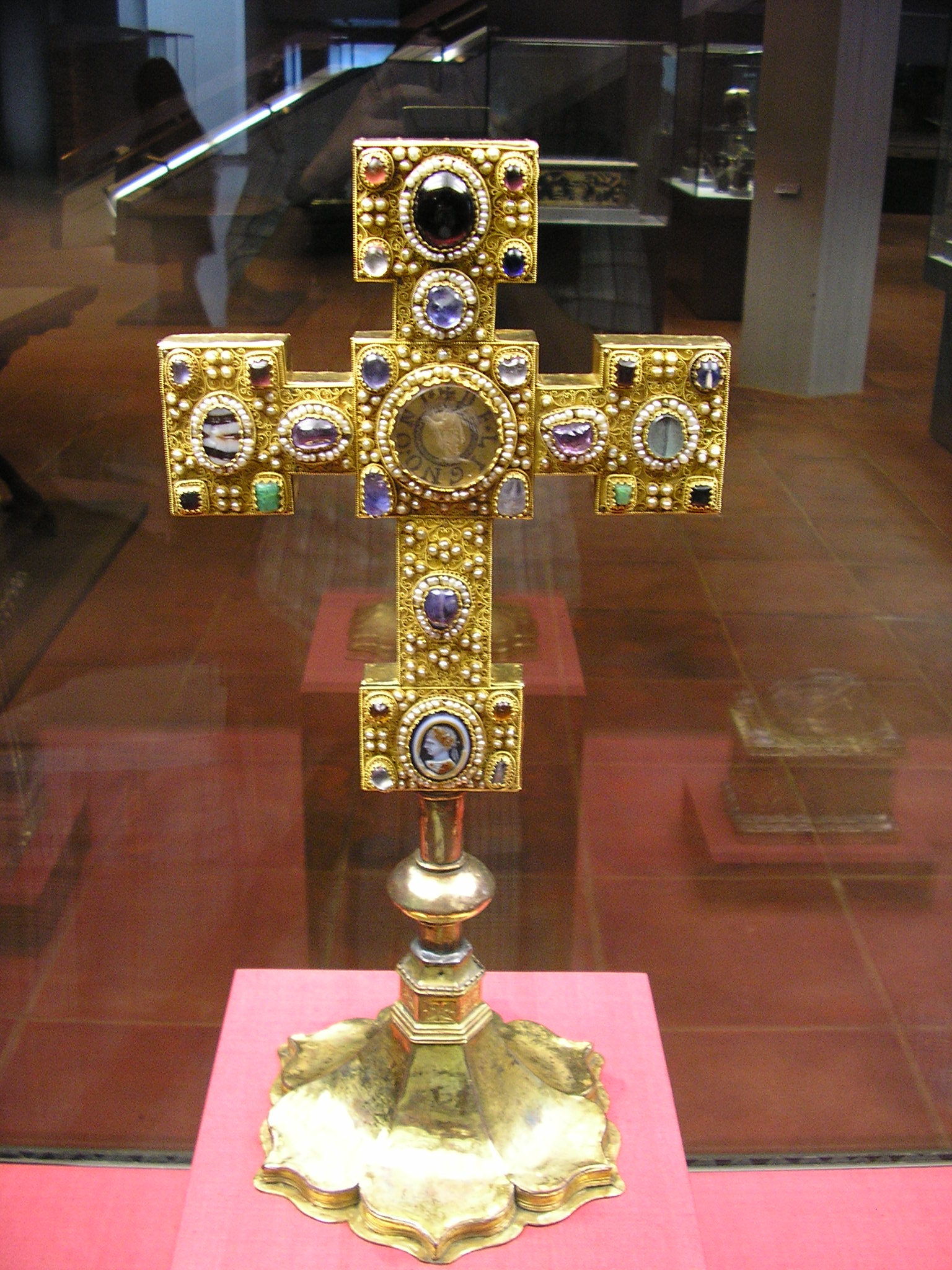
Processional cross from Enger

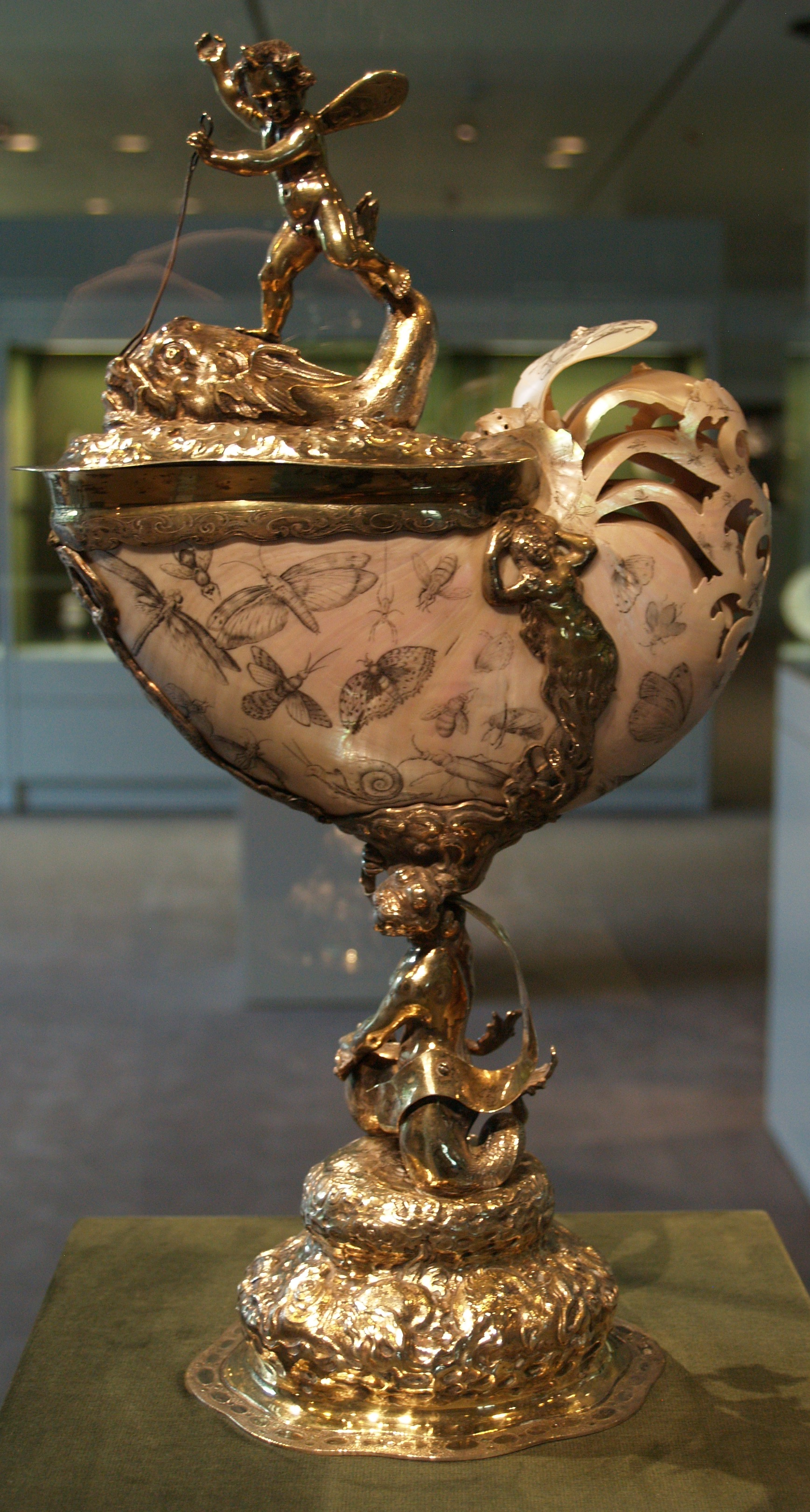
Nautilus cup of Aleksander Kęsowski, abbot of Oliwa, 1643-1667

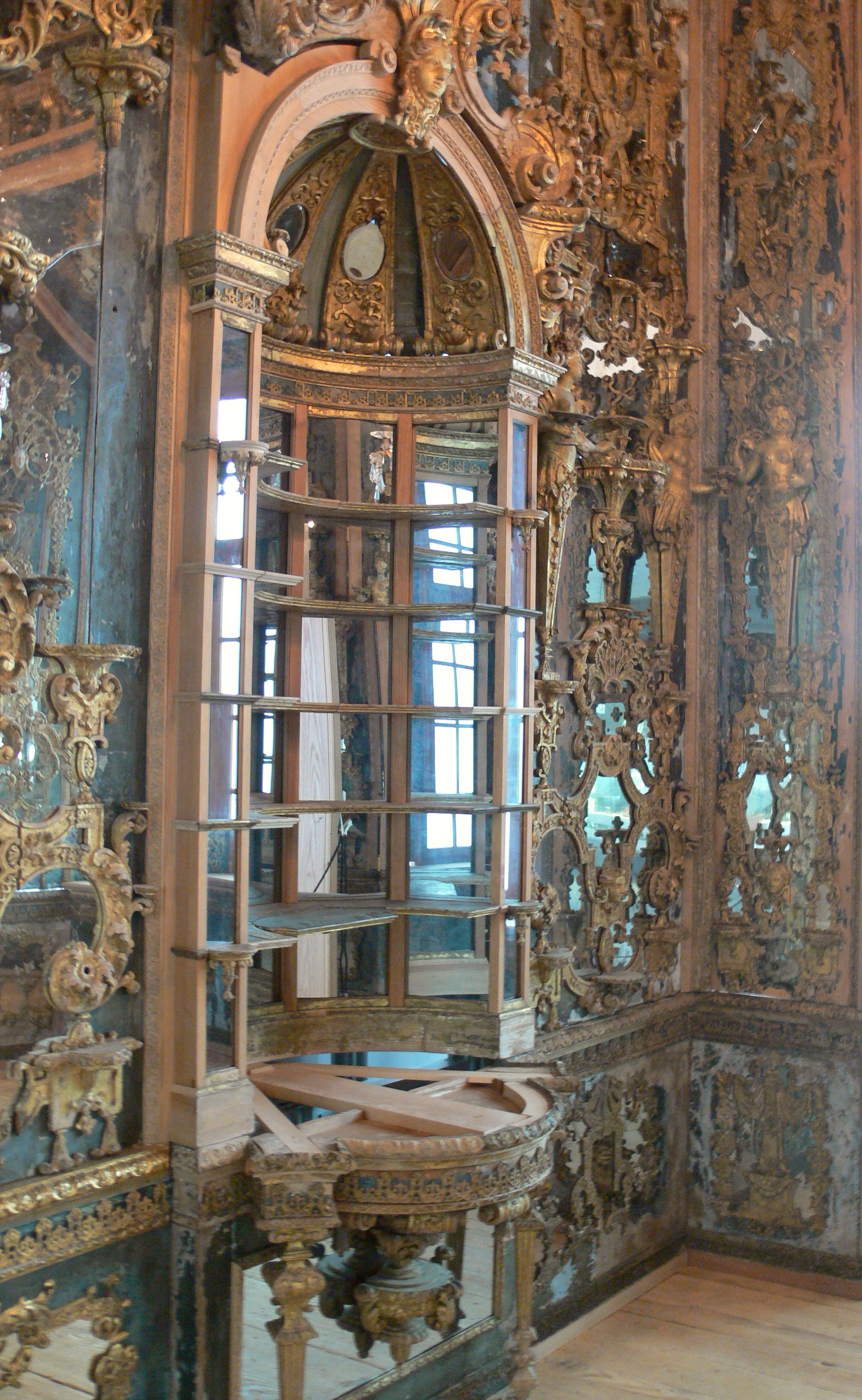
Merseburger Spiegelkabinett, 1712–1715, by Johann Michael Hoppenhaupt I., from the Merseburg palace (today at Köpenick palace)

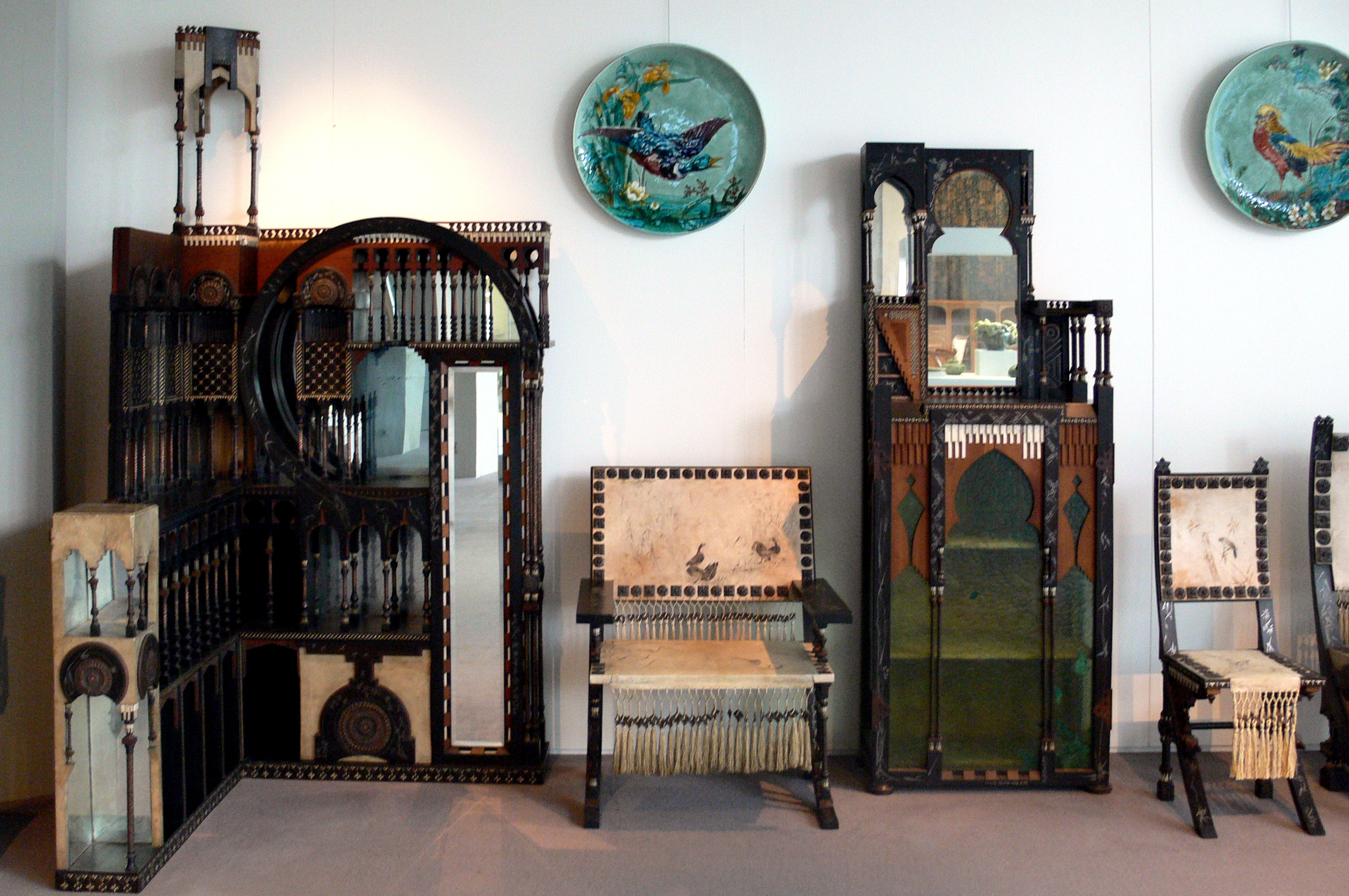
Drawing room furniture by Carlo Bugatti, Milan around 1885

== See also ==
- Cloth of St Gereon, the second oldest European wall tapestry still existing
