= Kulturforum =

Cultural buildings in Berlin

Coordinates: 52.507°N 13.371°E

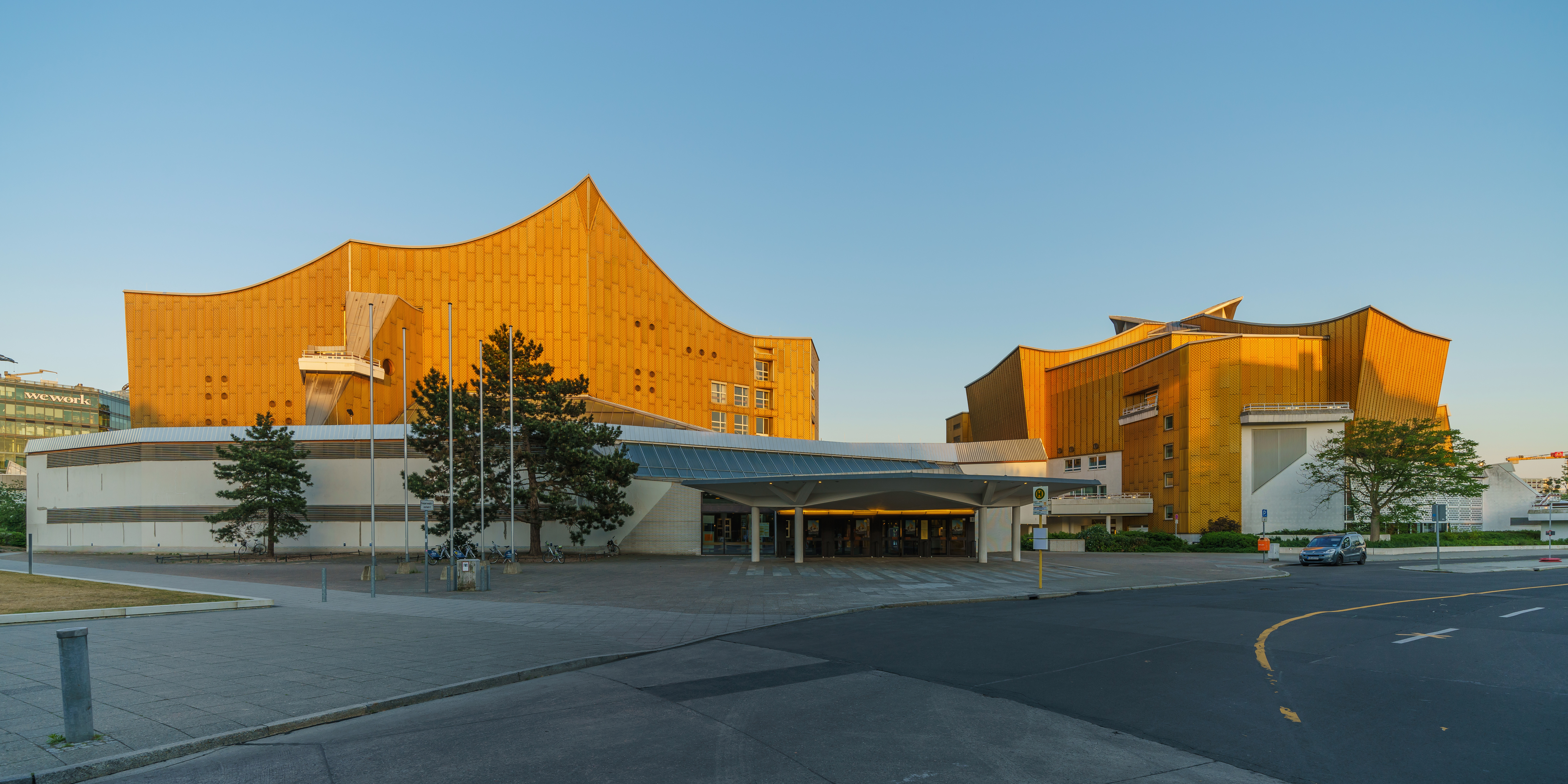
Philharmonie and Chamber Music Hall, designed by Hans Scharoun

Kulturforum, Berlin

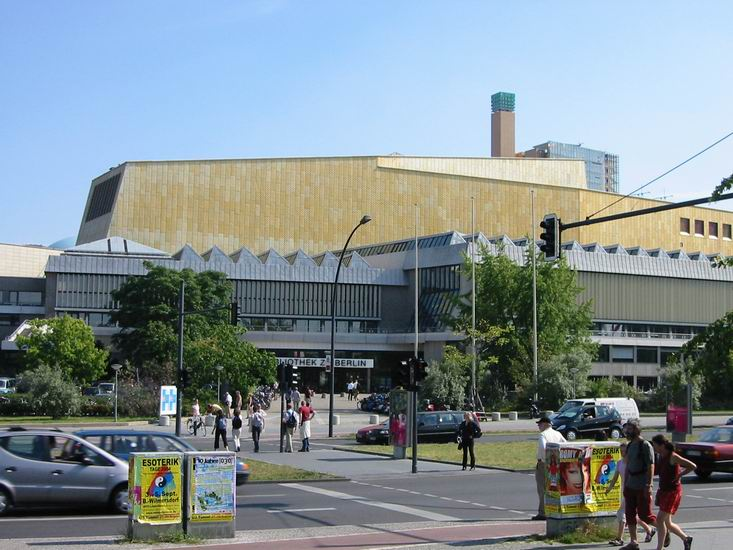
Berlin State Library, designed by Hans Scharoun

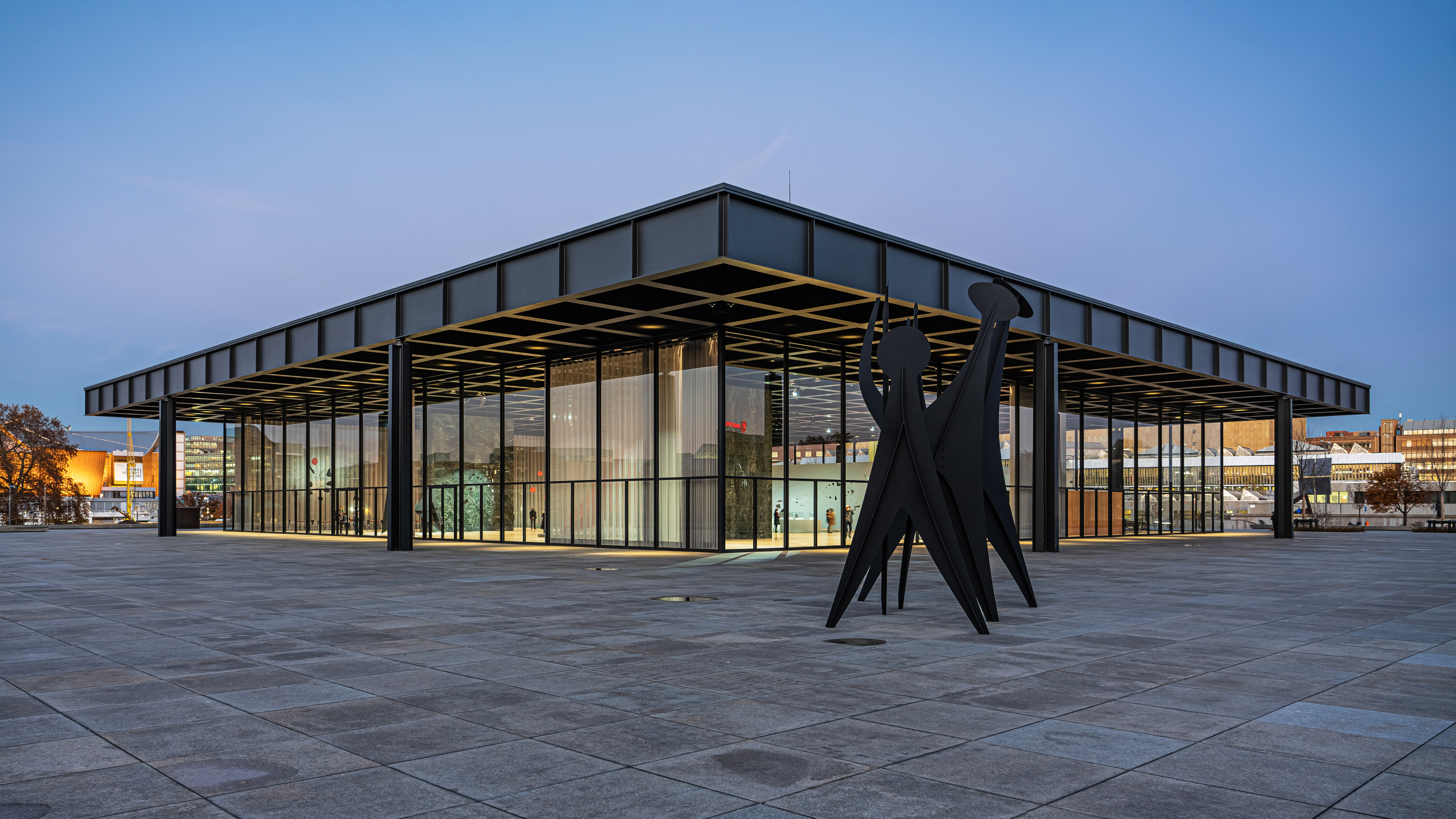
Neue Nationalgalerie, designed by Mies van der Rohe

The Kulturforum (English: Cultural Forum) is a collection of cultural buildings in Berlin. It was built up in the 1950s and 1960s at the edge of West Berlin, south of the Tiergarten, after most of the once unified city's cultural assets had been lost behind the Berlin Wall. The Kulturforum is characterized by its innovative modernist architecture; several buildings are distinguished by the organic designs of Hans Scharoun, and the Neue Nationalgalerie was designed by Mies van der Rohe. Today, the Kulturforum lies immediately to the west of the redeveloped commercial node of Potsdamer Platz.

== Cultural institutions ==
Among the cultural institutions housed in and around the Kulturforum are:

- Neue Nationalgalerie
- Gemäldegalerie
- Kunstgewerbemuseum Berlin (Museum of Decorative Arts)
- Musical Instrument Museum
- Kupferstichkabinett (Print room)
- Kunstbibliothek Berlin (Berlin Art Library)
- Berliner Philharmonie
- Chamber Music Hall
- Berlin State Library Haus Potsdamer Straße
- Ibero-American Institute
- Wissenschaftszentrum
- St. Matthäus-Kirche

== History ==
After World War II, the public art collections were divided by the Berlin Wall, with particularly the Old Master paintings split between the Bode Museum in what became the east, and a temporary exhibition space in Dahlem, a western suburban district of Berlin. Public opinion at the time of reunification strongly favored a return of the Old Masters to their historical home at the Bode Museum. Yet Wolf-Dieter Dube, the then director-general of the Berlin State Museums, pushed through his plans to move the collection to the Kulturforum, a modernist complex as answer to Museum Island. The Neue Nationalgalerie became the centerpiece of the new complex, completed in 1998 when the long-planned $140 million Gemäldegalerie was opened nearby to house paintings of the 13th to 18th centuries.
