= Kupferstichkabinett Berlin =

Prints museum in Berlin, Germany

Kupferstichkabinett
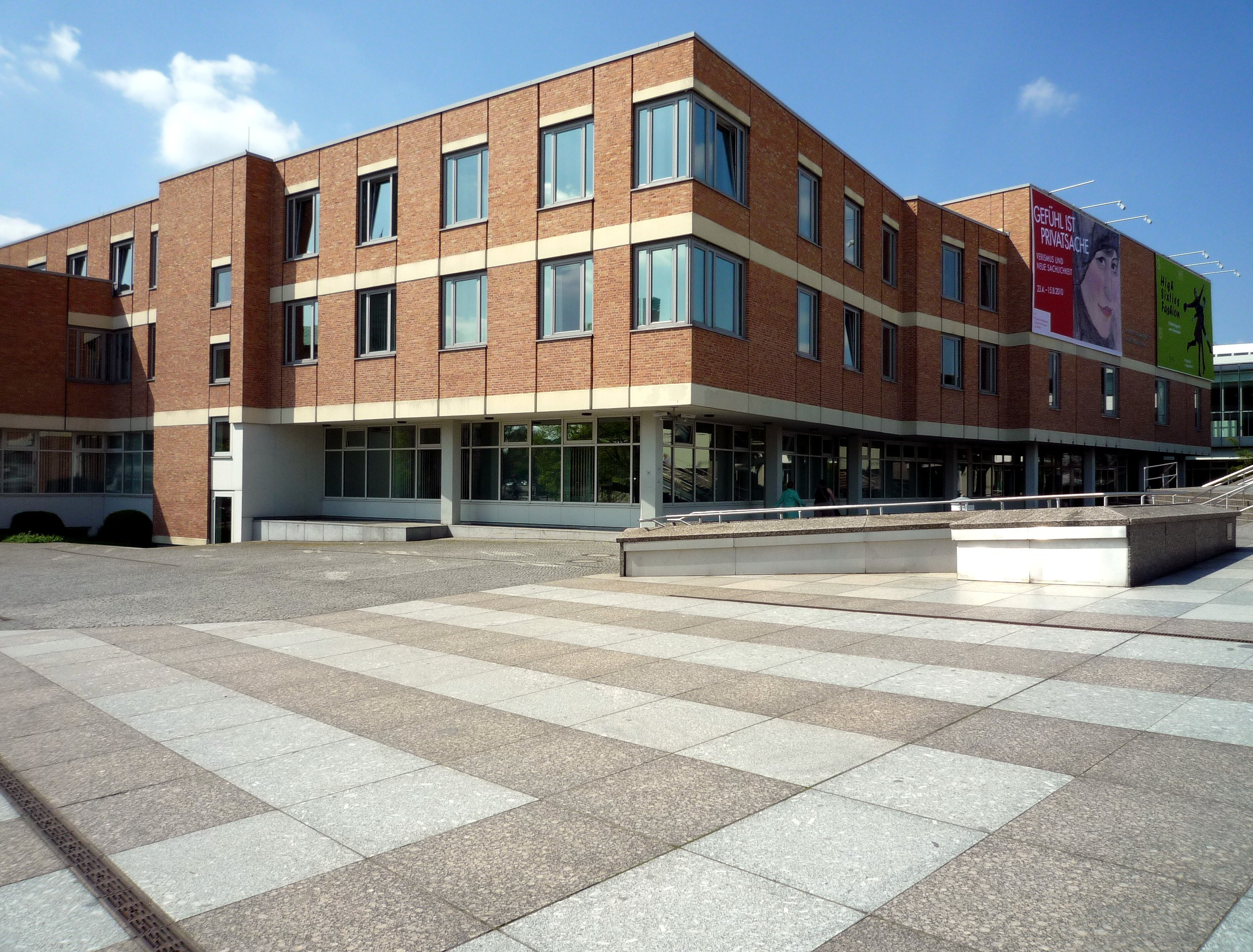
- The Kupferstichkabinett in the Kulturforum
- Interactive fullscreen map
- Location: Berlin, Germany
- Coordinates: 52°30′30″N 13°22′01″E
- Website: Official website

The Kupferstichkabinett, or Museum of Prints and Drawings, is a prints museum in Berlin, Germany. It is part of the Berlin State Museums, and is located in the Kulturforum on Potsdamer Platz. It is the largest museum of graphic art in Germany, with more than 500,000 prints and around 110,000 individual works on paper (drawings, pastels, watercolours, oil sketches).

== History ==
The Kupferstichkabinett was officially founded in 1831, with a collection of drawings and watercolours acquired by Frederick William I in 1652 at its core. It was first housed in the Altes Museum beside the collections of Old Master paintings and Classical sculpture from ancient Greece and Rome, as exemplars of "High Art". The collection grew throughout the 19th and 20th centuries, with the addition of Medieval, Renaissance and later works, including drawings by Albrecht Dürer and Matthias Grünewald, Sandro Botticelli's illustrations of Dante's Divine Comedy (purchased in 1882), and the estate of Adolph Menzel. Prominent members of former staff include Max Lehrs.

In 1986 the Kupferstichkabinett took over the graphics collection of the National Gallery of Berlin, whose emphasis was on 20th-century prints, including Expressionist works that the Nazis had classified as "degenerate" and confiscated. In 1994 it opened in a new building in the Kulturforum, reuniting the parts of the collection that had been split between East and West Berlin together with the National Gallery's collection.

== Collection ==
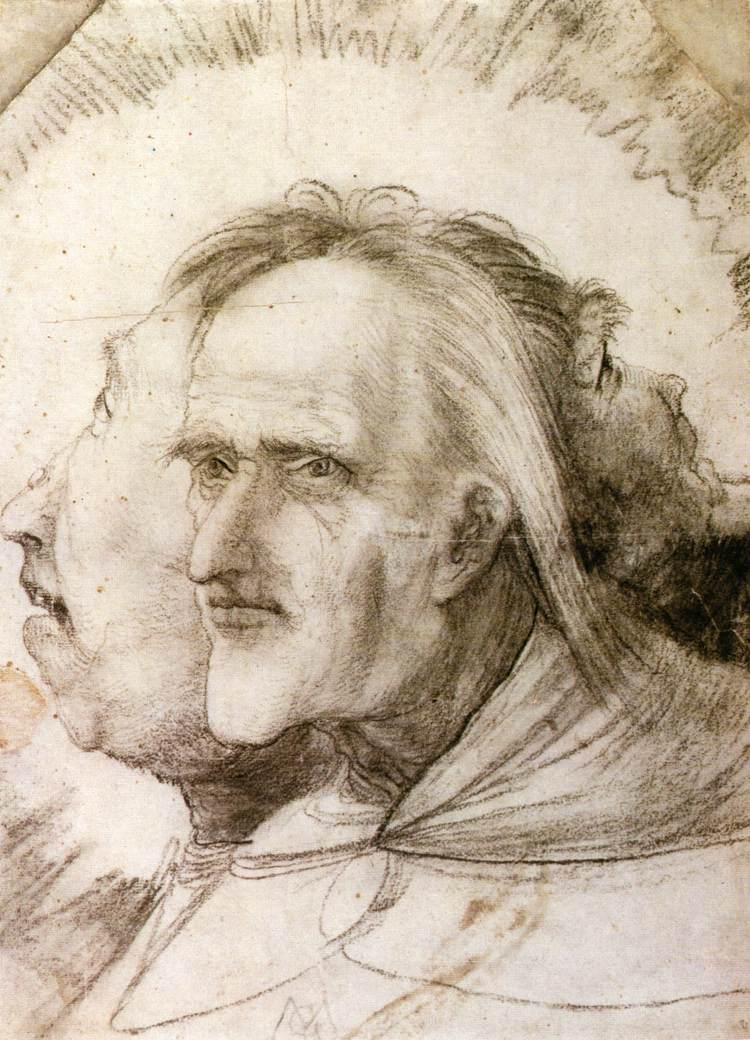
Drawing by Matthias Grünewald in the Kupferstichkabinett.

The emphasis is on European drawings and printed graphics from the Middle Ages to the present, as well as illuminated manuscripts, sketchbooks, topographical drawings and printing plates. The older artists include Dürer, Grünewald, Botticelli and Menzel, as well as Altdorfer, Bosch, Bruegel, Chodowiecki, Friedrich, Mantegna, Rembrandt, Schinkel, and Tiepolo. More recent artists include Kirchner, Munch and Picasso, Pop Artists (Warhol, Hamilton, Johns, Stella) conceptual artists, minimalists, and contemporary artists working in Berlin. The collection of the Kupferstichkabinett also includes Friedrich Gilly's plan for a monument to Frederick II of Prussia from 1796.

Some of the works on paper are stored in other Berlin collections that have a relevant theme, such as the Ethnological and Asian Art Museums, the Art Library, and the Scharf-Gerstenberg Collection. The works in the Kupferstichkabinett cannot be permanently displayed, due to the size of the collection and the air- and light-sensitivity of works on paper; however, the museum holds regular temporary exhibitions.

The museum's patrons primarily include the Graphische Gesellschaft zu Berlin - Vereinigung der Freunde des Kupferstichkabinetts e. V. (Berlin Graphic Society - Association of Friends of the Museum of Prints and Drawings). The association has existed since 1997, it supports the expansion of the collection, arranges donations and acquires individual works according to the recommendations of the director of the Kupferstichkabinett.

== Other activities ==
The Kupferstichkabinett carries out research and conservation activities and has its own Conservation Advisory Council. Particular candidates for preservation include the bound handwritten works from the Middle Ages and Renaissance, large 19th-century cartoons (e.g. by Peter von Cornelius), and technically complex contemporary works. Other subjects of research include silverpoint drawings and drawings by Grünewald. There is also a continually updated index of watermarks to assist in the dating of works on paper.

== See also ==
- Divine Comedy illustrated by Botticelli
- MS Ham. 78.A.5
