= List of museums and galleries in Berlin =

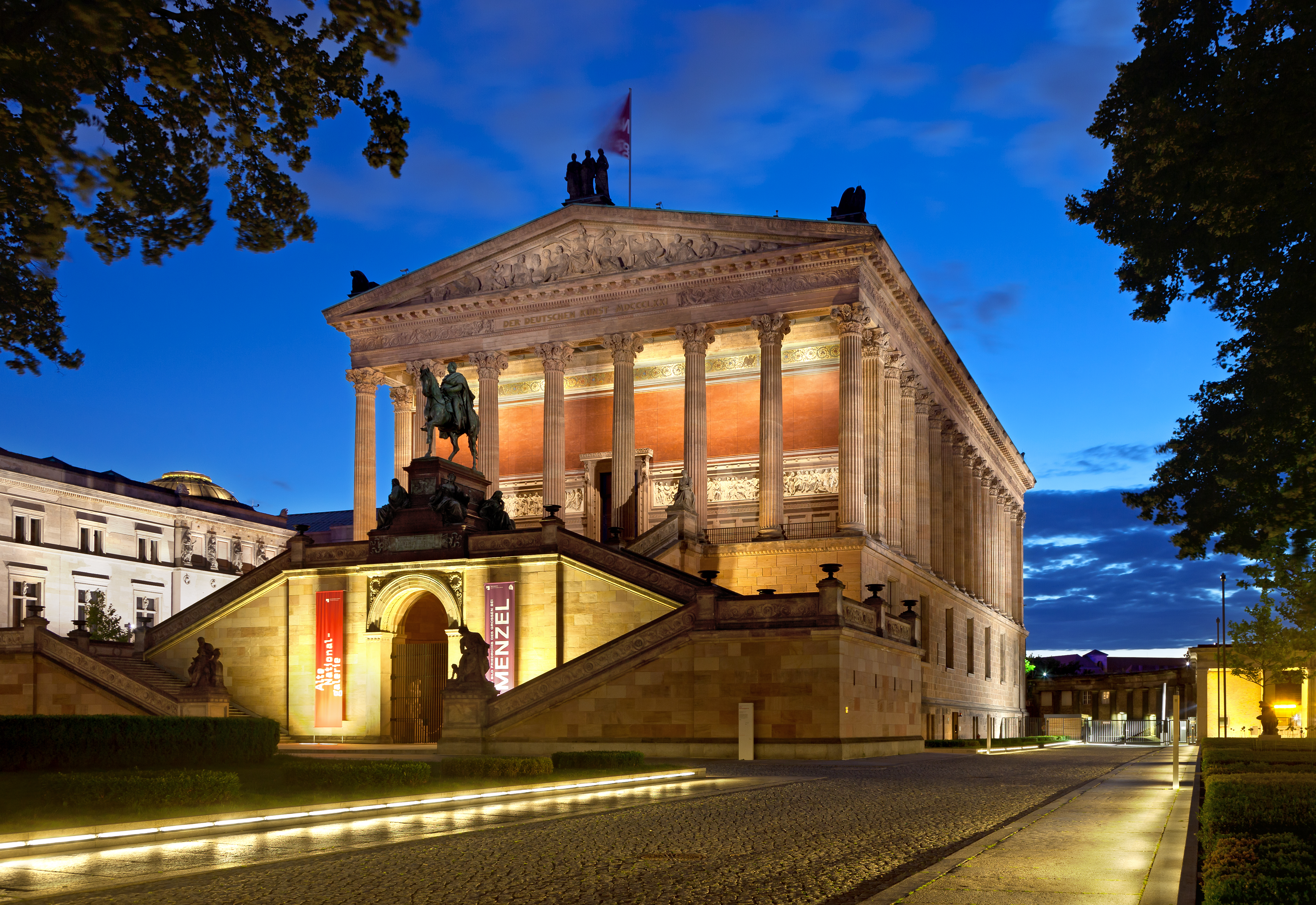
The Alte Nationalgalerie is part of the Museum Island, a UNESCO World Heritage Site

== Active museums ==
This is a list of museums and non-commercial galleries in Berlin, Germany.

Name	Image	Neighborhood	Borough	Type	Summary
Abguss-Sammlung Antiker Plastik		Charlottenburg	Charlottenburg-Wilmersdorf	Art	Part of the Free University of Berlin, plaster casts of sculptures from Ancient Greece, Rome, and the Byzantine Empire
Academy of Arts, Berlin		Friedrichstadt	Mitte	Art	Located in Pariser Platz, offers exhibitions, concerts, debates, readings, film, theatre, and dance performances
AG Märkische Kleinbahn		Lichterfelde	Steglitz-Zehlendorf	Railway	Railway vehicles, exhibits about the history of Zehlendorfer Railway
Alice - Museum for Children		Oberschöneweide	Treptow-Köpenick	Children's	Website, located in the FEZ Berlin
Allied Museum		Dahlem	Steglitz-Zehlendorf	History	Cold War history and roles of the Western Allies (US, France and Britain) in Germany between 1945 and 1994 and their contribution to liberty in Berlin
Alte Nationalgalerie		Museum Island	Mitte	Art	Part of the Berlin State Museums, gallery showing a collection of Neoclassical, Romantic, Biedermeier, Impressionist and early Modernist artwork
Altes Museum		Museum Island	Mitte	Art	Part of the Berlin State Museums, features antiquities - art and culture of the Ancient Greeks, Etruscans, and Romans
Veterinary Anatomy Theater		Mitte	Mitte	Medical	Part of the Humboldt University of Berlin, historic teaching auditorium for the veterinary school
Anna Seghers Museum		Adlershof	Treptow-Köpenick	Biographical	Website, rooms where author Anna Seghers lived, operated by the Academy of Arts, Berlin Archive
Anne Frank Zentrum		Mitte	Mitte	History	Exhibit about Anne Frank and about antisemitism and intolerance in the present
Anti-War Museum		Wedding	Mitte	History	Website, facts on the topics of war and peace, and features an original air raid shelter from World War II, weapons, war toys, peace movement
Archenhold Observatory		Alt-Treptow	Treptow-Köpenick	Science	Observatory and museum of astronomy
Bauhaus Archive		Tiergarten	Mitte	Art	Art pieces, items, documents and literature which relate to the Bauhaus School (1919–1933)
Berggruen Museum		Charlottenburg	Charlottenburg-Wilmersdorf	Art	Part of the Berlin State Museums, features, collection of modern art classics including Pablo Picasso, Paul Klee, Henri Matisse, and Alberto Giacometti
BcmA Berlin		Kreuzberg	Friedrichshain-Kreuzberg	Art	BcmA Berlin is a non-profit cultural and artistic platform for artists in Berlin to present and create new ideas in a highly collaborative project space.
Berlin Energy Museum		Steglitz	Steglitz-Zehlendorf	Technology	Website, development of energy generation and supply systems, located in a former power plant
Berlin Museum of Medical History at the Charité		Mitte	Mitte	Medical	Website, developments in medicine including the view of and into the body, patients, today's medicine, pathological-anatomical specimens, microscopes, medical instruments; formerly the Pathology Museum of Rudolf Virchow
Berlin Musical Instrument Museum		Tiergarten	Mitte	Music	Musical instruments from the 16th-century onwards, located at the Kulturforum
Staatliche Münze Berlin		Reinickendorf	Reinickendorf	Numismatic	Website
Berlin Story Museum		Kreuzberg	Friedrichshain-Kreuzberg	History	Website, photos and artifacts about the city's history
Berlin Underworlds Museum		Gesundbrunnen	Mitte	History	Website, history and tours of the city's underground systems including the bunker systems in Berlin's subway system, recovered bombs and ammunition stores, Berlin's pneumatic post system, breweries and blind tunnels
Berlin U-Bahn Museum		Westend	Charlottenburg-Wilmersdorf	Transportation	Website, history of the city's subway system, located in the historical signal tower at the Berlin Olympiastadion station
Berlin Wall Memorial and Documentation Centre		Mitte	Mitte	History	Features the last piece of Berlin Wall with the preserved grounds, a documentation center with exhibits and a visitor center with film
Berlin-Dahlem Botanical Garden and Botanical Museum		Dahlem	Steglitz-Zehlendorf	Natural history	Botanical garden and museum about plants and botany, botanical art
Berlin-Hohenschönhausen Memorial		Alt-Hohenschönhausen	Lichtenberg	Prison	Former Stasi prison
Berliner DDR-Motorradmuseum		Mitte	Mitte	Transportation	Website, over 140 motorcycles, scooters and mopeds from East German manufacturers
Berlinische Galerie		Kreuzberg	Friedrichshain-Kreuzberg	Art	Berlin's visual art from 1945 on, including painting, graphics, sculpture, multimedia, photography, architecture and artists’ archives
Berlin-Marzahn Windmill		Marzahn	Marzahn-Hellersdorf	Mill	Website, reconstructed 19th-century windmill
Bezirksmuseum Marzahn-Hellersdorf		Marzahn	Marzahn-Hellersdorf	Local	Website, local and cultural history of the district
BlackBox Cold War		Kreuzberg	Friedrichshain-Kreuzberg	History	Website, exhibition pavilion about the history of Checkpoint Charlie
Braun-Sammlung Ettel, Museum für Design		Moabit	Mitte	Design	Website
Brecht Weigel Museum		Mitte	Mitte	Historic house	Website, last place Bertolt Brecht and Helene Weigel lived and worked, operated by the Academy of Arts, Berlin
Britz Windmill		Britz	Neukölln	Mill	Website, restored 19th-century windmill
Bode Museum		Museum Island	Mitte	Art	Part of the Berlin State Museums, features sculpture, Byzantine art, coins and medals
Boros Collection		Mitte	Mitte	Art	Contemporary art by international artists dating from 1990 to the present, located in a former air-raid shelter, tours by appointment
Bröhan Museum		Charlottenburg	Charlottenburg-Wilmersdorf	Art	Art and design including Art Nouveau, Art Deco and functionalism
Brücke Museum		Dahlem	Steglitz-Zehlendorf	Art	Collection of works by Die Brücke ("The Bridge"), an early 20th-century expressionist movement
C/O Berlin		Charlottenburg	Charlottenburg-Wilmersdorf	Photography	Website
Charlottenburg Palace		Charlottenburg	Charlottenburg-Wilmersdorf	Historic house	Part of the SPSG, including Old Palace, New Wing, Mausoleum, Belvedere, New Pavilion, Orangery and theater building (now exhibition rooms)
Checkpoint Charlie Museum		Kreuzberg	Friedrichshain-Kreuzberg	History	History of attempts to cross the Berlin Wall out of East Germany
Computerspielemuseum Berlin		Friedrichshain	Friedrichshain-Kreuzberg	Video games	Cultural history of computer gaming
Daimler Contemporary Berlin		Tiergarten	Mitte	Art	Website, contemporary art, located at Haus Huth at Potsdamer Platz
DDR Museum		Mitte	Mitte	History	Life of people living in East Germany
Designpanoptikum		Mitte	Mitte	Art	Surrealist museum of industrial objects
Palais Populaire		Mitte	Mitte	Art	Website, operated by Deutsche Bank, international contemporary art
Deutsches Historisches Museum		Mitte	Mitte	History	History of Germany, German life and culture
Berlin Spy Museum		Mitte	Mitte	History	History of espionage, interactive exhibition
Deutschlandmuseum		Mitte	Mitte	History	Website, immersive and interactive exhibition on German History
Die Mauer-Asisi Panorama Berlin		Mitte	Mitte	History	Website, Berlin Wall cityscape in a rotunda and accompanying photography exhibition into the period
Domäne Dahlem		Dahlem	Steglitz-Zehlendorf	Agriculture	Website, historic manor house featuring exhibits on agriculture and nutrition, a 1920s merchant shop, butcher shop, food laboratory of the Imperial Health Office, exhibits about bees, working farm
East Side Gallery		Friedrichshain	Friedrichshain-Kreuzberg	Art	Art painted on sections of the Berlin Wall as an international memorial for freedom
Ephraim Palais		Nikolaiviertel	Mitte	Multiple	Website, exhibitions of art, history and culture of Berlin
Ethnological Museum of Berlin		Museum Island	Mitte	Ethnographic	Part of the Berlin State Museums, features art, sculptures, objects and archaeological artifacts from Africa, Meso-America, Native Americans, South Seas cultures, ethnic minorities in Southeast-Asia
The Feuerle Collection		Kreuzberg	Kreuzberg	Art	Website, art museum juxtaposes international contemporary artists with Imperial Chinese furniture and Southeast Asian sculptures.
FHXB Friedrichshain-Kreuzberg Museum		Kreuzberg	Friedrichshain-Kreuzberg	Local	Website, local history and culture, regional history on current issues
Fire Brigade Museum Berlin		Tegel	Reinickendorf	Firefighting	Website
Grunewald Forest Museum		Grunewald	Charlottenburg-Wilmersdorf	Natural history	Website, animals and plants of the Grunewald (forest)
Forum Willy Brandt Exhibition		Mitte	Mitte	Biographical	Website, life of Willy Brandt
Fotografiska Berlin	Exterior of Fotografiska Berlin on Oranienburger Strasse.	Mitte	Mitte	Photography	Website
Friedrichsfelde Palace		Friedrichsfelde	Lichtenberg	Historic house	Website, located in Tierpark Berlin, restored 1800-period castle, exhibits about the castle and zoo history
Friedrichswerder Church		Mitte	Mitte	Art	Part of the Berlin State Museums, currently closed
Futurium		Mitte	Mitte	Technology	
Gaslaternen-Freilichtmuseum Berlin		Charlottenburg	Charlottenburg-Wilmersdorf	History	Gas Lantern Open-Air Museum Berlin, located in Tiergarten park.
Gemäldegalerie		Tiergarten	Mitte	Art	Part of the Berlin State Museums, features European painting ranging from the 13th to 18th century, located at the Kulturforum
Georg-Kolbe-Museum		Westend	Charlottenburg-Wilmersdorf	Art	House, studio and gardens of sculptor Georg Kolbe
German Museum for the Blind		Dahlem	Steglitz-Zehlendorf	History	Website, history of the blind and visually impaired in Germany, Louis Braille and the development of Braille
German Museum of Technology		Kreuzberg	Friedrichshain-Kreuzberg	Technology	History of science and technology, including rail, maritime and aviation transport, photography, computers, Science Center Spectrum
German-Russian Museum		Karlshorst	Lichtenberg	Military	German-Soviet and German-Russian relations with a focus on the German-Soviet war from 1941 to 1945
Glienicke Palace		Wannsee	Steglitz-Zehlendor	Historic house	19th-century palace, west wing also houses the Hofgärtner Museum about the life and work of the court gardener
Gipsformerei		Charlottenburg	Charlottenburg-Wilmersdorf	Art	Website, part of the Berlin State Museums, features replicas of works from the collections of the SMB and from other European museums
Gothic House		Spandau	Spandau	Historic house	Website, a secular medieval monument, the upper floor houses a branch of the City Historical Museum Spandau
Grünau Water Sports Museum		Grünau	Treptow-Köpenick	Maritime	Website, history of water sports like rowing and sailing, includes rowboats, canoes, dragon boats, polo canoes, boat club artifacts, photographs
Gründerzeitmuseum at Gutshaus Mahlsdorf		Mahlsdorf	Marzahn-Hellersdorf	Historic house	Website, features eleven fully furnished rooms dating from 1870 to 1900, the Gründerzeit
Günter Litfin Memorial		Mitte	Mitte	History	Website, part of the Berlin Wall Foundation
Hamburger Bahnhof: Museum of the Present		Moabit	Mitte	Art	Part of the Berlin State Museums, features contemporary art exhibits
Hemp Museum		Nikolaiviertel	Mitte	Agriculture	Website, focus is cannabis, including its effects, cultivation, processing, and possibilities of use
Haus am Lützowplatz		Tiergarten	Mitte	Art	Website, hosts six to eight exhibitions of national and international contemporary artists in all media
Haus am Waldsee		Zehlendorf	Steglitz-Zehlendorf	Art	Website, platform for contemporary artists who live and work in Berlin and have already achieved significant international standing
Haus der Kulturen der Welt		Tiergarten	Mitte	Art	Located in Tiergarten Park, exhibitions of international contemporary art, with a special focus on non-European cultures and societies
Herzberge Boiler House Museum		Lichtenberg	Lichtenberg	Technology	Website, restored boiler house that provided heat, warm water and electricity for a hospital complex, includes exhibits about the history of the Herzberge medical complex of the Königin Elisabeth Hospital
Hohenschönhausen Castle		Alt-Hohenschönhausen	Lichtenberg	Art	Restored manor house with exhibitions of art and culture
Hošek Contemporary		Mitte	Mitte	Art	Website, located on a boat MS Heimatland near Fischerinsel, exhibitions of international contemporary art, with a special focus on performances and sound installations
House of the Wannsee Conference		Wannsee	Steglitz-Zehlendorf	History	1915 villa used for the Wannsee Conference of 20 January 1942, exhibits about the Holocaust in Germany
Huguenot Museum		Friedrichstadt	Mitte	Religious	Located in the Französischer Dom, the history of the Huguenots and the emergence of the French congregation in Berlin
Industriesalon Schöneweide		Oberschöneweide	Treptow-Köpenick	Technology	Website
Jewish Museum Berlin		Kreuzberg	Friedrichshain-Kreuzberg	Jewish	History of the Jews in Germany
Jagdschloss Grunewald		Grunewald	Charlottenburg-Wilmersdorf	Historic house	Part of the SPSG, Baroque palace with Dutch and German paintings from the 17th century
Jugend Museum		Schöneberg	Tempelhof-Schöneberg	Children's	Website, housed at Schöneberg Museum
Käthe Kollwitz Museum		Charlottenburg	Charlottenburg-Wilmersdorf	Art	Works by the German artist Käthe Kollwitz (1867–1945)
The Kennedys (museum)		Mitte	Mitte	Biographical	Lives of the American Kennedy family
Keramik-Museum Berlin		Charlottenburg	Charlottenburg-Wilmersdorf	Art	Contemporary and historic ceramic art
Knoblauchhaus		Nikolaiviertel	Mitte	Historic house	Website, 18th-century town house
Köpenick City Hall		Köpenick	Treptow-Köpenick	History	Website, permanent exhibition "The Captain of Köpenick"
Köpenick Museum		Köpenick	Treptow-Köpenick	History	Website
Köpenick Palace		Köpenick	Treptow-Köpenick	Decorative arts	Part of the Berlin State Museums, Baroque palace, houses decorative arts of the Renaissance, Baroque and Rococo periods, outstanding masterworks in interior design from the 16th to 18th centuries
KPM World		Tiergarten	Mitte	Ceramics	Website, KPM Royal Porcelain Factory tours, history and production of their porcelain
Kulturforum		Tiergarten	Mitte	Multiple	Part of the Berlin State Museums, collection of many museums, galleries and concerts halls
Kunstbibliothek (Museum collections)		Tiergarten	Mitte	Art	Part of the Berlin State Museums, boasts valuable collections on the history of architecture, photography, graphic design, fashion, book art, and media art, located at the Kulturforum
Kunstgewerbemuseum Berlin		Tiergarten	Mitte	Decorative arts	Part of the Berlin State Museums, features European and Byzantine decorative arts, located at the Kulturforum
Kunsthaus Dahlem		Dahlem	Steglitz-Zehlendorf	Art	Website, German post-war modernist art in East and West
Kunstraum Kreuzberg/Bethanien		Kreuzberg	Friedrichshain-Kreuzberg	Art	Website, contemporary art, group exhibitions of themed exhibits relating to current social and cultural activity
Kupferstichkabinett Berlin		Tiergarten	Mitte	Art	Part of the Berlin State Museums, features prints and drawing, located at the Kulturforum
KW Institute for Contemporary Art		Mitte	Mitte	Art	Contemporary art exhibitions
Labyrinth Children's Museum		Wedding	Mitte	Children's	Website
Liebermann Villa		Wannsee	Steglitz-Zehlendor	Art	Former summer residence of the German painter Max Liebermann, showcases his art
Lipstick Museum René Koch		Wilmersdorf	Charlottenburg-Wilmersdorf	Fashion	Website, open by appointment, historic lipstick and makeup cases, celebrity photographs with kiss marks, advertising, costumes
Luisa Catucci Gallery		Mitte	Mitte	Art	Website
Luisa Catucci Art Lab		Neukölln	Neukölln	Art	Website
MACHmit! Museum for kids		Prenzlauer Berg	Pankow	Children's	Website
Marienfelde Refugee Center Museum		Marienfelde	Tempelhof-Schöneberg	History	Website, history of the Marienfelde refugee transit camp and the history of flight and emigration in divided Germany
Märkisches Museum		Mitte	Mitte	Local	Culture and history of Berlin
Madame Tussauds Berlin		Mitte	Mitte	Wax	Wax figures of media celebrities, musicians, politicians, historical figures
MAGICUM - Berlin Magic Museum		Mitte	Mitte	Magic	Website, magical practices and artifacts from all over the world
Martin-Gropius-Bau		Kreuzberg	Friedrichshain-Kreuzberg	Art	Modern and contemporary art and photography
me Collectors Room Berlin		Tiergarten	Mitte	Art	Changing exhibitions of contemporary art from private collections
Memorial to the German Resistance		Tiergarten	Mitte	History	Resistance to National Socialism from 1933 to 1945
Memorial to the Murdered Jews of Europe		Friedrichstadt	Mitte	History	Memorial and visitor center exhibits about the persecution and extermination of the Jews of Europe and the historical sites of the crimes
Mendelssohn-Remise		Friedrichstadt	Mitte	Biographical	Website, history of the Mendelssohn family and the Fascists' forced liquidation of the former Mendelssohn & Co. bank
Body Worlds		Mitte	Mitte	Natural history	Website, museum by Body Worlds about the human body, features preserved human bodies
Military History Museum at Belin-Gatow		Gatow	Spandau	Aviation	History of the Luftwaffe of the German Armed Forces
Mitte Museum		Wedding	Mitte	Local	Website, local history and culture, features themed rooms about everyday life in around 1900
Mori Ôgai Memorial Site		Mitte	Mitte	Biographical	Website, life and work of author Mori Ōgai, part of the Japan Centre at the Humboldt University of Berlin
Museum Blindenwerkstatt Otto Weidt		Mitte	Mitte	History	Website, history of Otto Weidt's workshop for the blind and efforts to protect his Jewish workers in World War II
Museum des Kapitalismus		Kreuzberg	Friedrichshain-Kreuzberg	Economy	Historical and present exhibitions and programs related to Capitalism and economical influence on society
Museum in the Kulturbrauerei		Prenzlauer Berg	Pankow	History	Website, everyday life in East Germany
Museum Flat WBS 70		Hellersdorf	Marzahn-Hellersdorf	Historic house	Website, typical East German apartment with all furnishings made in East Germany
Museum in the Old Waterworks		Friedrichshagen	Treptow-Köpenick	Technology	Website, located in a former waterworks facility, history of the city's water supply, sewage disposal and waste treatment facilities
Museum for Architectural Drawing		Mitte	Mitte	Architecture	Historic architectural drawings, operated by the Tchoban Foundation
Museum for Communication Berlin		Mitte	Mitte	Media	Website, origins, development and future of the information society including postal systems and telecommunications
Museum Lichtenberg		Rummelsburg	Lichtenberg	Local	Website, local history, located in the former town hall
Museum Neukölln		Britz	Neukölln	Local	Website, local history and culture
Museum of Architecture of Technische Universität Berlin		Charlottenburg	Charlottenburg-Wilmersdorf	Architecture	Website, drawings, prints and photographs related to architecture, mostly by 19th and 20th century Prussian architects
Museum of Asian Art		Dahlem	Steglitz-Zehlendor	Art	Part of the Berlin State Museums, one of the largest museums of ancient Asian art in the world
Museum of European Cultures		Dahlem	Steglitz-Zehlendor	Ethnographic	Part of the Berlin State Museums, culture and cultural contacts within Europe from the 18th century to the present day, including costumes, handicrafts, folk lore
Museum of Film and Television Berlin		Tiergarten	Mitte	Media	History of film and television in Germany
Museum of Letters		Hansaviertel	Mitte	Printing	Website, emergence, production and history of typography, scripts and sign systems
Museum of Illusions		Mitte	Mitte	Multiple	Website
Museum of Islamic Art		Museum Island	Mitte	Art and Archaeology	Part of the Berlin State Museums, located in the Pergamon Museum
Museum of Natural History		Mitte	Mitte	Natural history	Includes dinosaurs, fossils, minerals, German animals, geology, astronomy, shells
Museum of Photography		Charlottenburg	Charlottenburg-Wilmersdorf	Photography	Part of the Berlin State Museums, features photographs from the state collection and the Helmut Newton Foundation
Museum of Things		Kreuzberg	Friedrichshain-Kreuzberg	Design	Houses the collection of the Deutscher Werkbund, 20th and 21st century design for everyday objects
Museum of Unheard Of Things		Schöneberg	Tempelhof-Schöneberg	Curiosities	Website, collection of artistic, scientific and technical objects from the past and present linked by stories
Museum Pankow		Prenzlauer Berg	Pankow	Multiple	Website, three sites: main museum of local history at Prenzlauer Allee 227; home on Heynstraße 8 depicts upper class life in 1900; house at Dunckerstraße 77
Museum Reinickendorf		Hermsdorf	Reinickendorf	Local	Website, borough history and culture
Museumsdorf Düppel		Zehlendorf	Steglitz-Zehlendor	Open-air	Website, recreated medieval village
Nazi Forced Labour Documentation Centre		Niederschöneweide	Treptow-Köpenick	History	Preserved former Nazi forced labour camp
Neue Kirche		Friedrichstadt	Mitte	History	Former church, features exhibit about the development of parliamentary democracy in Germany
Neue Nationalgalerie		Tiergarten	Mitte	Art	Part of the Berlin State Museums, features modern art with a focus on early 20th century, part of the Kulturforum
Neues Museum		Museum Island	Mitte	Archaeology	Part of the Berlin State Museums, features Egyptian art, prehistoric and archaeological objects, classical antiquities, development of prehistoric and protohistoric cultures, spanning from the Middle East to the Atlantic, from north Africa to Scandinavia
New Synagogue Berlin-Centrum Judaicum		Mitte	Mitte	Religious	Permanent exhibition documenting the history of the building and of Berlin's Jewish community
nGbK (New Society for Fine Arts)		Kreuzberg	Friedrichshain-Kreuzberg	Art	Website, contemporary art exhibitions
Nikolaikirche		Nikolaiviertel	Mitte	Religious	Restored 13th-century church, site of many historic events in city history
Papestrasse SA Prison Memorial		Tempelhof	Tempelhof-Schöneberg	History	Website, exhibition on location that documents the history of the prison
Pergamon Museum		Museum Island	Mitte	Archaeology	Part of the Berlin State Museums, features antiquities, Middle Eastern art and artifacts, Islamic art, Vorderasiatisches Museum Berlin
Pergamon Museum-Das Panorama		Museum Island	Mitte	Archaeology	Part of the Berlin State Museums, new exhibition house that complements the Pergamon Museum
Pfaueninsel Palace		Wannsee	Steglitz-Zehlendor	Historic house	Part of the SPSG, closed for refurbishments since 2016
Police History Collection		Mariendorf	Tempelhof-Schöneberg	Law enforcement	Website, located in Berlin Police headquarters at Platz der Luftbrücke, includes uniforms, weapons, tools
Puppet Theatre Museum		Neukölln	Neukölln	Puppetry	Website, marionettes and theatrical puppets
Ramones Museum		Friedrichshain	Friedrichshain	Music	Dedicated to the American punk rock band the Ramones
Red Cross Museum		Friedenau	Tempelhof-Schöneberg	Medical	Website, history of the German Red Cross, includes uniforms, insignia, medical kits, equipment
Sammlung Scharf-Gerstenberg		Charlottenburg	Charlottenburg-Wilmersdorf	Art	Part of the Berlin State Museums, features surrealist art, traces the evolution of the art of the fantastic
Samurai Museum Berlin		Berlin-Mitte	Berlin-Mitte	Art	Website, art of the Samurai from the Peter Janssen Collection Berlin
Schloss Britz		Britz	Neukölln	Historic house	Restored 18th-century period manor house
Schöneberg Museum		Schöneberg	Tempelhof-Schöneberg	Local	Website, local history and culture
Schönhausen Palace		Niederschönhausen	Pankow	Historic house	18th-century Baroque palace
Schwules Museum		Mitte	Mitte	Culture	LGBT culture
Spy Museum Berlin		Mitte	Mitte	History	Website, history of spying, secret agents and secret services
Spandau Citadel		Spandau	Spandau	Military	16th-century Renaissance fortress, includes the City History Museum Spandau, the ZAK Center for Contemporary Art, or the permanent exhibition “Unveiled. Berlin and its Monuments”
Sportmuseum Berlin		Westend	Charlottenburg-Wilmersdorf	Sports	Website, located in Olympiapark, German sports history
Stasi Museum		Lichtenberg	Lichtenberg	History	History of the political system of the former East Germany, located in the former headquarters of the Stasi
Steglitz Museum		Steglitz	Steglitz-Zehlendorf	Local	Website, local history and culture
Tempelhof Museum		Mariendorf	Tempelhof-Schöneberg	Local	Website, local history and culture
Topography of Terror		Kreuzberg	Friedrichshain-Kreuzberg	History	Site of the headquarters for the Secret State Police, the SS and the Reich Security Main Office
Trabi Museum		Kreuzberg	Friedrichshain-Kreuzberg	Automobile	Website, history of the Trabant
Tränenpalast: Palace of Tears		Friedrichstadt	Mitte	History	Former border crossing point for East Germans, impact of a divided Germany on people's personal lives
Treptow Museum		Johannisthal	Treptow-Köpenick	History	Website
Urban Nation Museum for Contemporary Art		Schöneberg	Tempelhof-Schöneberg	Art	Website
Villa Oppenheim (Charlottenurg-Wilmersdorf Museum)		Charlotteburg	Charlottenburg-Wilmersdorf	History	Website, late 19th-century villa with museum about the regional and urban history of the district and Berlin's cultural history, 1908 art collection of the then independent city of Charlottenburg
Zehlendorf Museum		Steglitz	Steglitz-Zehlendorf	Local	Website, local history and culture
Zille Museum		Nikolaiviertel	Mitte	Art	Website, life and work of Heinrich Zille, including drawings, lithographs and photographs
Deutsches Zweirad- und NSU-Museum		Kreuzberg	Friedrichshain-Kreuzberg	Transportation	Website, historic motorcycles, sidecars, engines and bicycles

== Defunct museums ==
Name	Area of focus	Close date	Notes
Sugar Museum	History	2012	Properties acquired by- and incorporated as a core exhibition of the German Museum of Technology
Kunsthaus Tacheles	Art	2012	
Deutsche Guggenheim	Art	2013	
Beate Uhse Erotic Museum	Sex	September 2014	
Berlin S-Bahn Museum	History, local	2016	
Arratia Beer Gallery	Art	August 2018	
The Story of Berlin Museum	History, local	2018	
Deutsches Currywurst Museum	Food	December 2018	
Dalí - Die Ausstellung am Potsdamer Platz	Art		
Das Verborgene Museum	Art	January 2022	
Micky Schubert Gallery	Art	July 2017	
Program	Art	2012	
