= Berlin Museum =

Berlin Museum may refer to:

- Museum Island
- Altes Museum
- Antikensammlung Berlin
- Egyptian Museum of Berlin
- Neues Museum
- Pergamon Museum
- Vorderasiatisches Museum Berlin

== See also ==
- List of museums and galleries in Berlin
