= Program =

Program/programme, programmer, or programming may refer to:

== Business and management ==
- Program management, group of several related projects managed together
- Time management
- Program, a part of planning

== Arts and entertainment ==
- Programme (booklet) or playbill, a printed leaflet about a live event

=== Audio ===
- Programming (music), generating music electronically
- Radio programming, act of scheduling content for radio
- Synthesizer programmer, a person who develops the instrumentation for a piece of music

=== Video or television ===
- Broadcast programming, scheduling content for television
- Program music, a type of art music that attempts to render musically an extra-musical narrative
- Synthesizer patch or program, a synthesizer setting stored in memory
- Television show or program/programme
- "Program", an instrumental song by Linkin Park from LP Underground Eleven
- Programmer, a film that could be used as either an A-movie or B-movie; see B-movie

== Science and technology ==
- Computer program, a set of instructions that describes to a computer how to perform a specific task
- Computer programming, the act of instructing computers to perform tasks
  - Programming language, an artificial language designed to communicate instructions to a machine
  - Game programming, the software development of video games
- Mathematical programming, or optimization, is the selection of a best element
- Programmer, a person who writes software
- Programmer (hardware), a physical device that configures electronic circuits
- Program (machine), a technical setting stored in the memory of a machine or piece of hardware to be executed, including computers
- Research program, a professional network of scientists conducting basic research
- Software engineer, someone who participates in a software development process

== Other uses ==
- Media Programme of the European Union
- Program (German non-profit), a project space in Berlin for art and architecture

== See also ==
- Application software
- Deprogramming
- Dramatic programming, fictional television content
- Neuro-linguistic programming, a pseudoscientific method aimed at modifying human behavior
- Twelve-step program, a set of guiding principles for recovery from addiction, compulsion, or other behavioral problems
- The Program (disambiguation)
