= Gaslaternen-Freilichtmuseum Berlin =

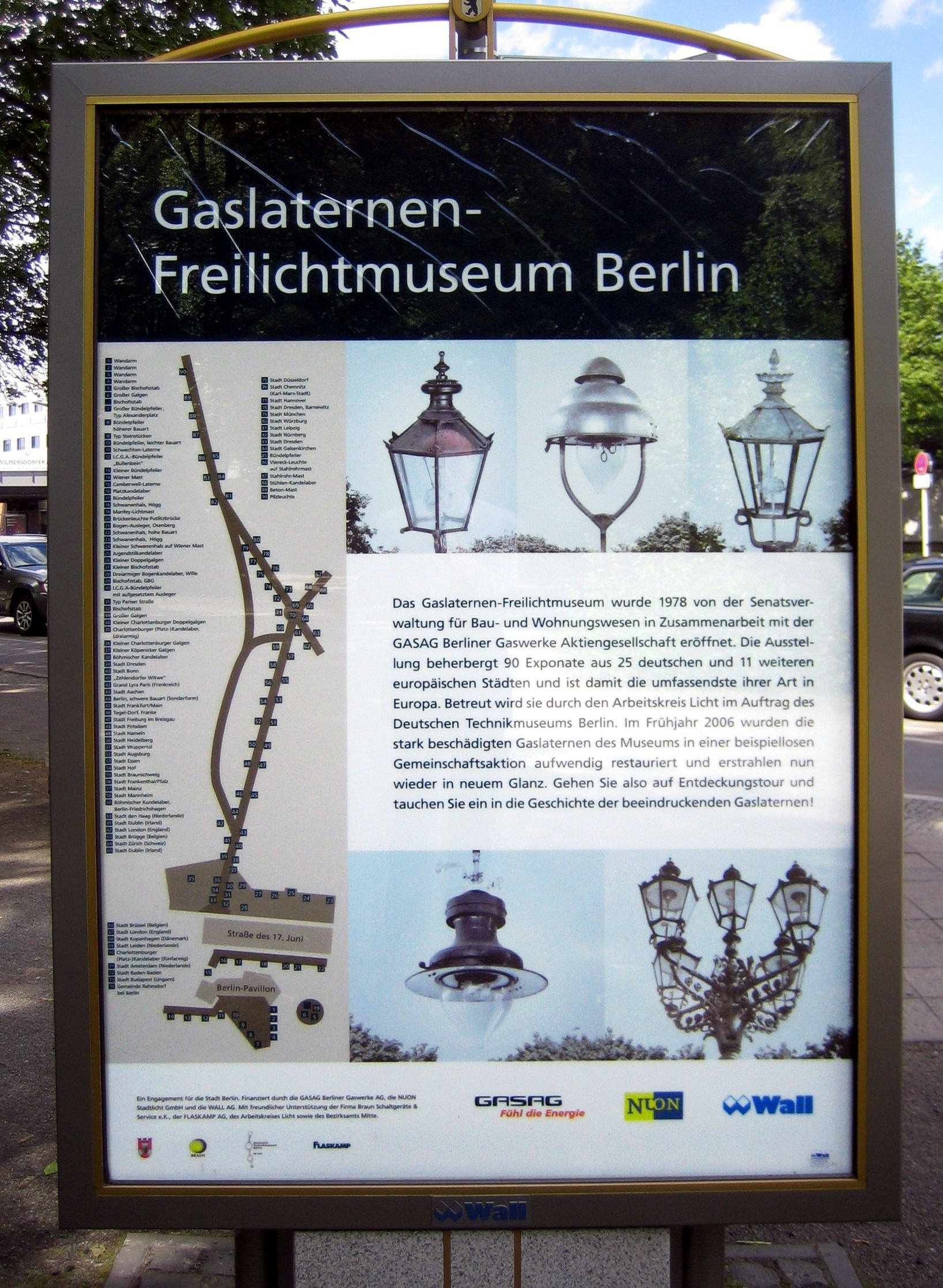
- Gaslaternen-Freilichtmuseum Berlin information board
- Established: 1978; 48 years ago
- Location: Strasse des 17, Tiergarten, Berlin, Germany
- Coordinates: 52°30′45.66″N 13°20′13.39″E
- Type: History museum

Gaslaternen-Freilichtmuseum Berlin (English: Gas Lantern Open-Air Museum Berlin) a permanent exhibition of historical gas lanterns in Tiergarten park in Berlin, Germany.

== History ==
=== Gas lantern history ===
Gas lanterns were used in Germany in 25 different cities, between 1826 until 1956. In 1826, the first gas lanterns were introduced to Germany with a contract by Imperial Continental Gas Association (ICGA), importing British-made Camberwell lanterns.

=== Museum history ===
The museum was started in 1978. The founding leadership for the museum was the Senate of Berlin's Department for Urban Development and Housing, in cooperation with the GASAG Berliner Gaswerke Aktiengesellschaft (English: Berlin Gas Works Corporation) and its supported by the Gaslight Culture Society. At its time of opening, the museum had 31 gas lanterns from all over Germany. In 2006, many of the lanterns were painted and cleaned up, and informational signs were added, prior to the 2006 FIFA World Cup. By 2009, the collection of gas lanterns grew to 90 objects.

In recent years, many of the gas lanterns have been moved to the German Museum of Technology (German: Deutsches Technikmuseum) in Kreuzberg, Berlin to get restored.

Gaslaternen-Freilichtmuseum Berlin

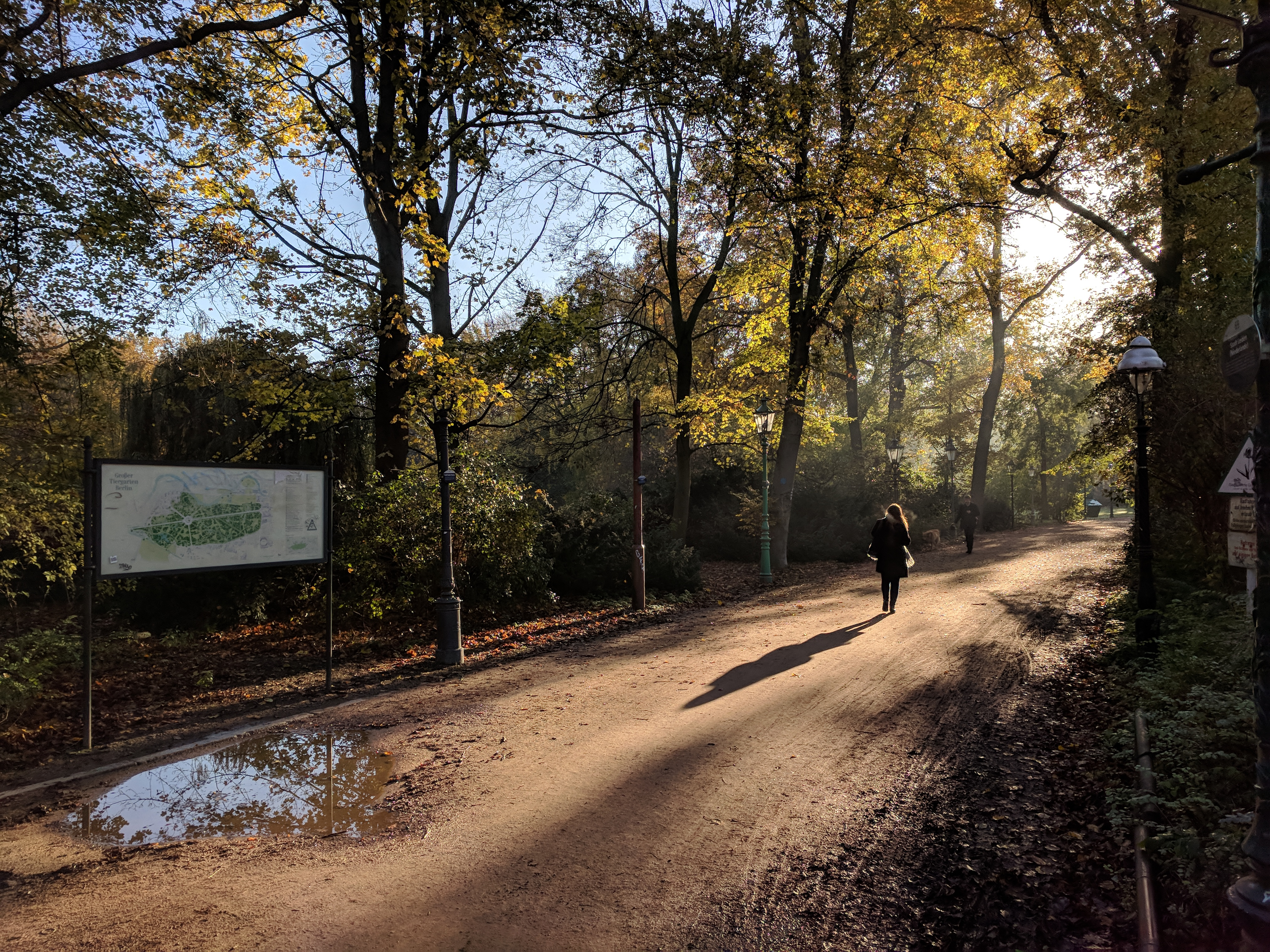
Example of the park trail of lanterns

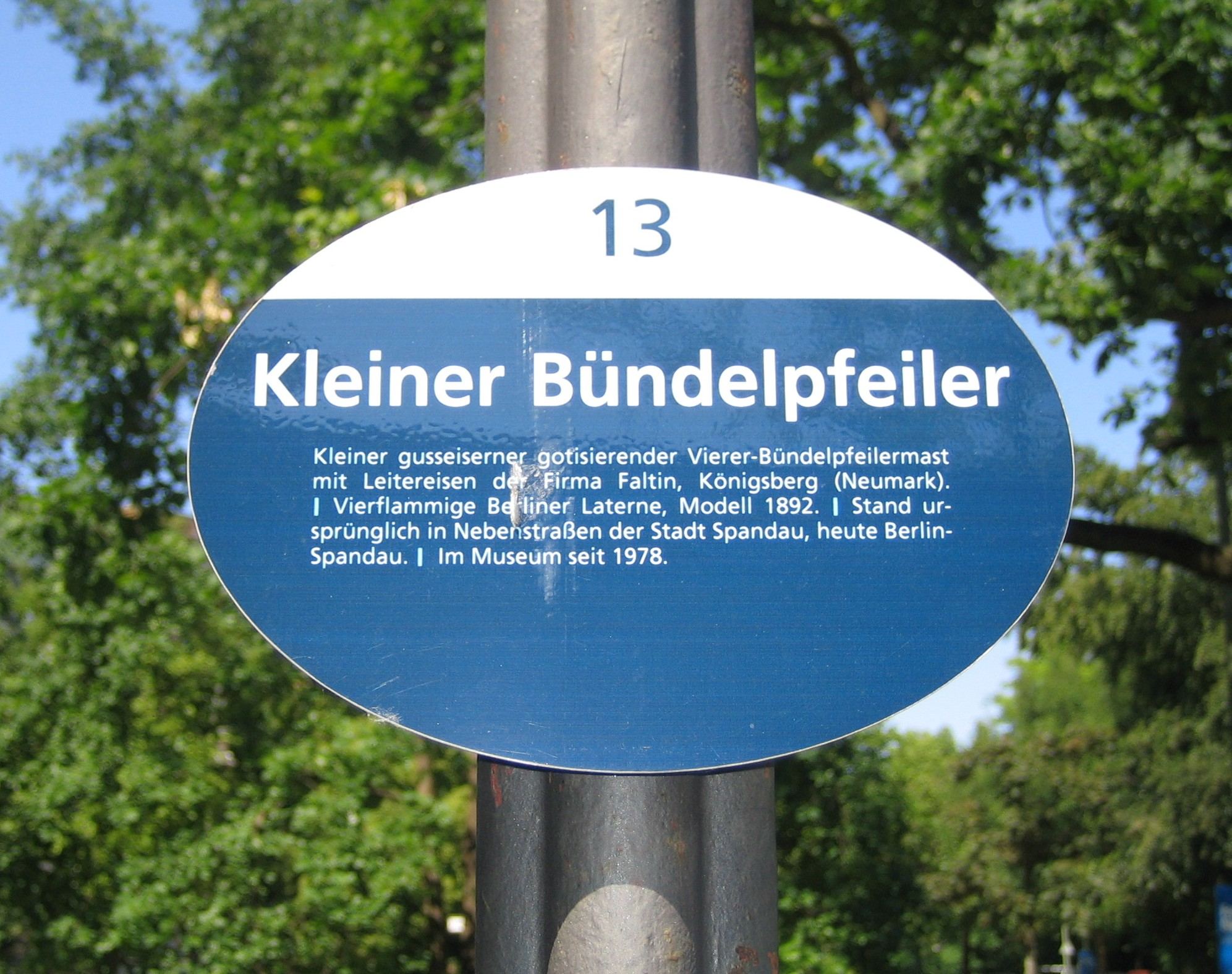
Example of the object signs with descriptions

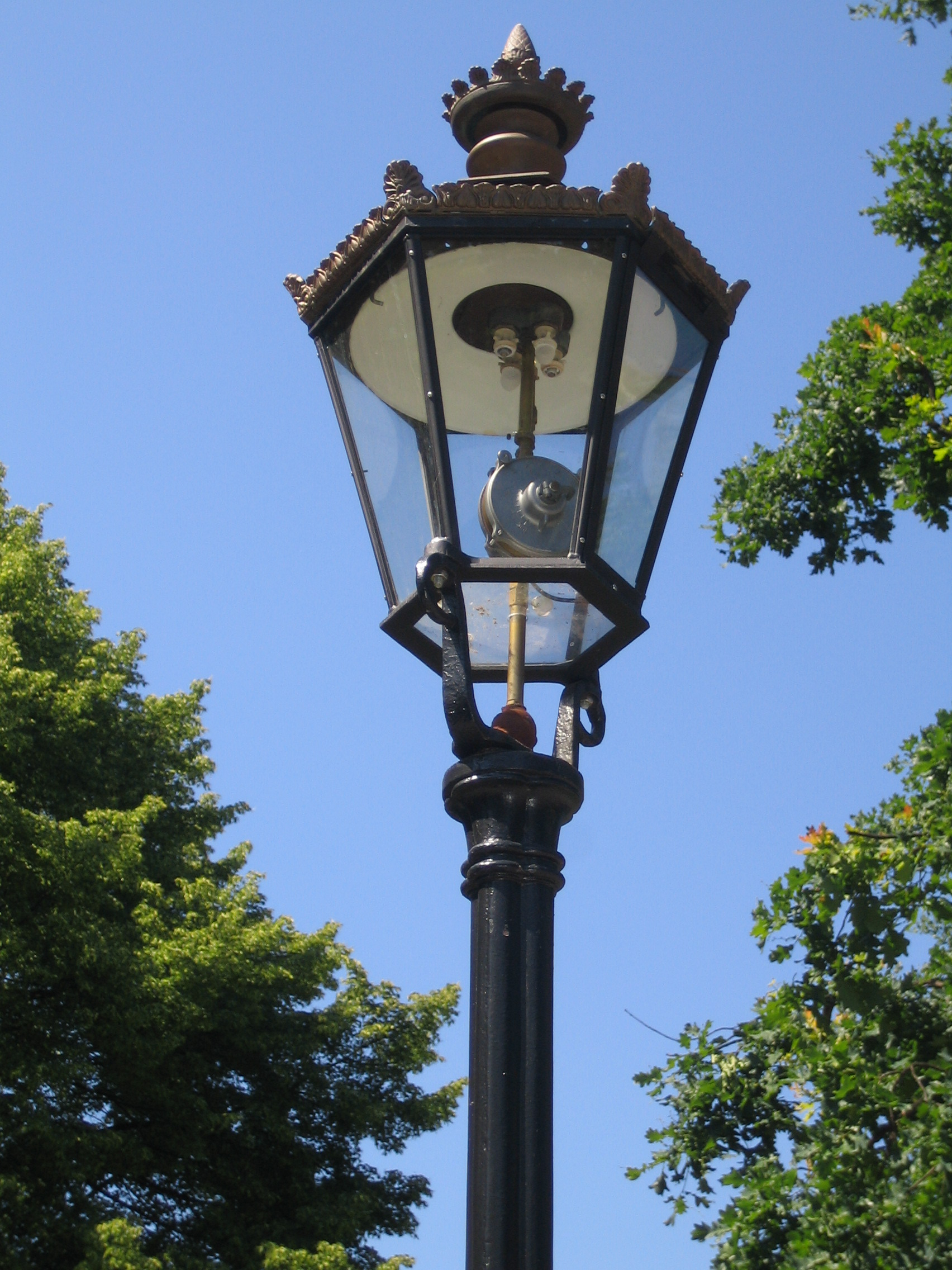
Laterne No. 14, Wiener Mast

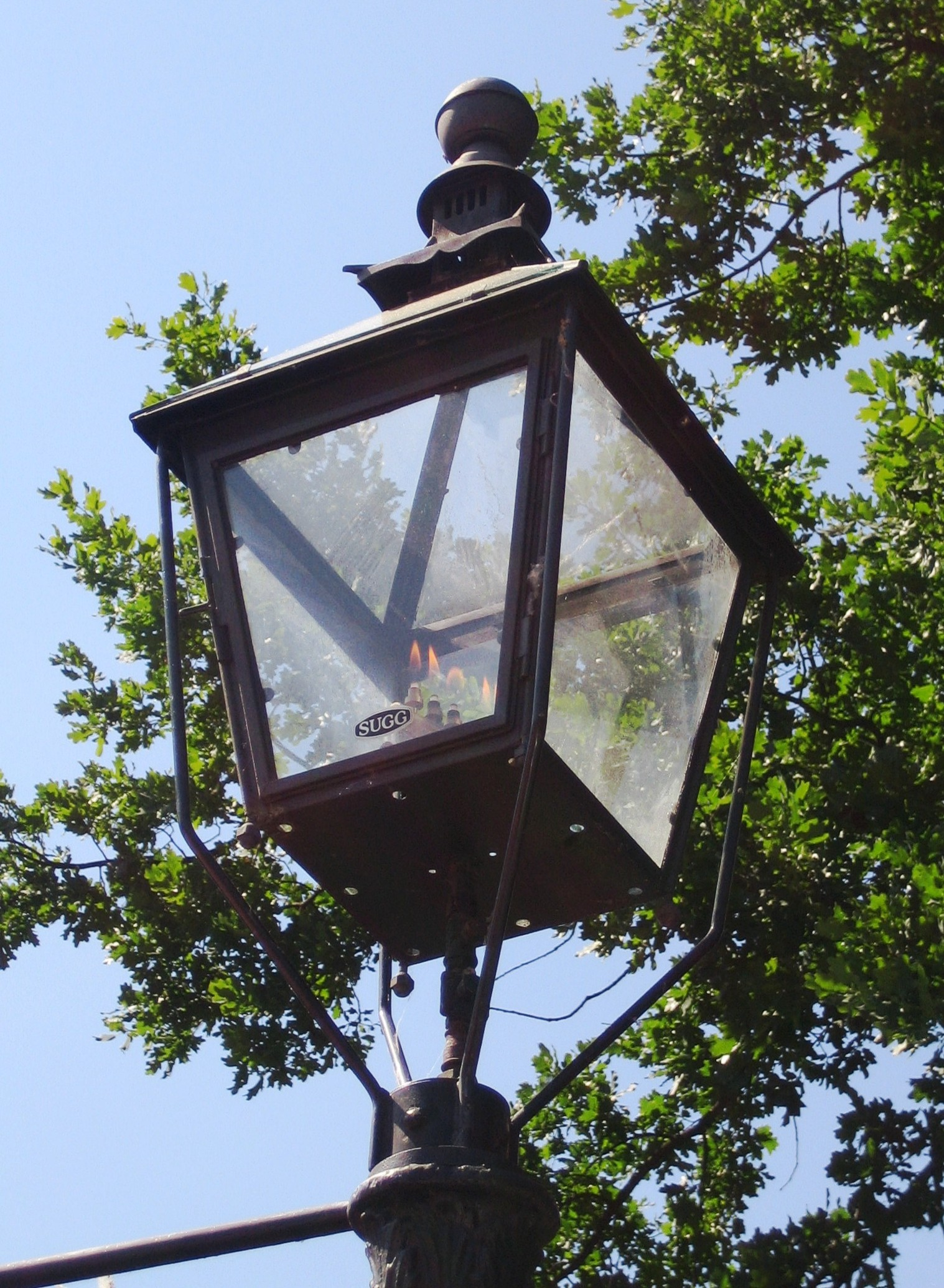
Laterne No. 15, Camberwell-Laterne

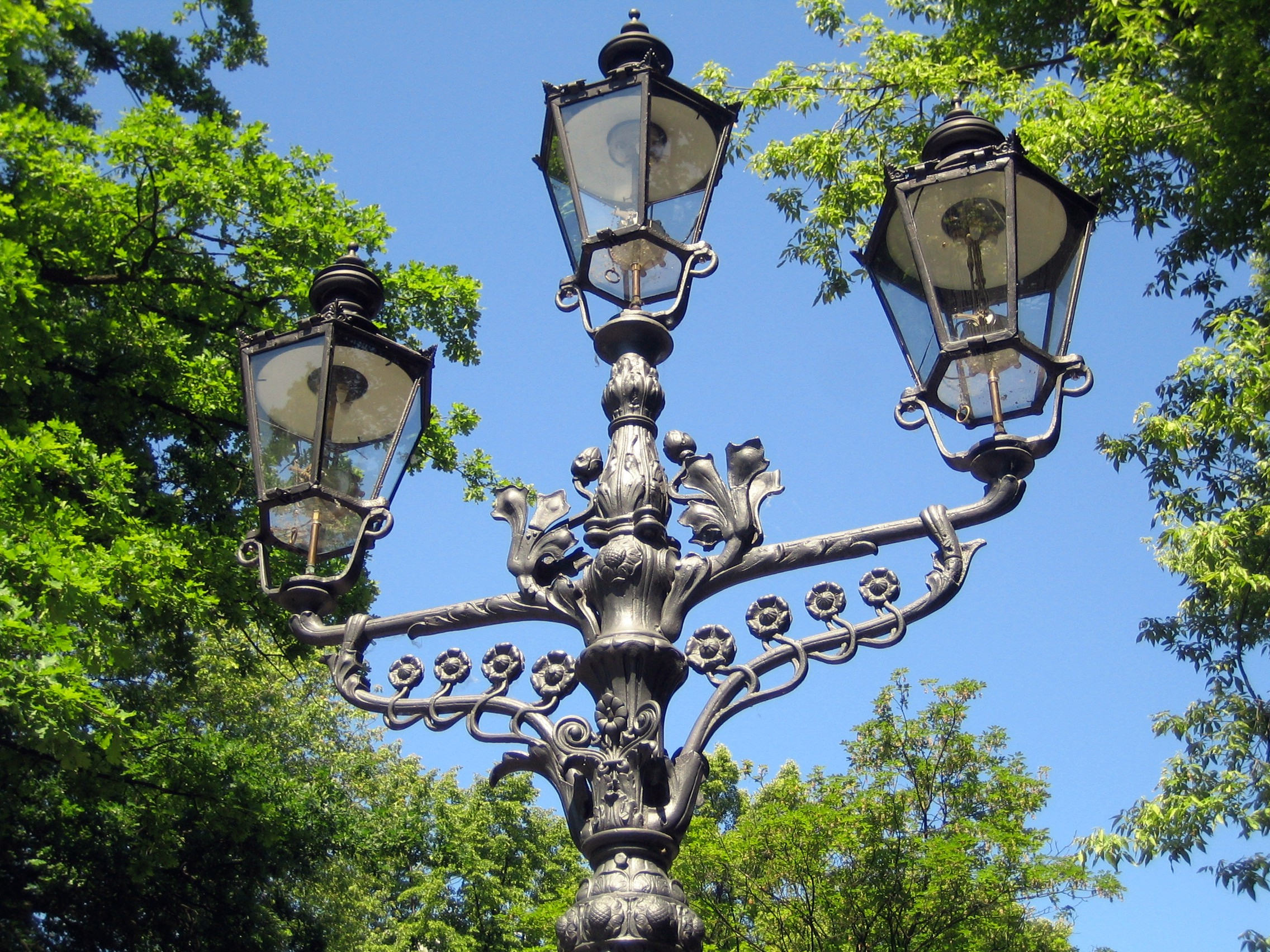
Laterne No. 35, Charlottenburg (square) candelabra (three-armed)

== See also ==
- List of museums and galleries in Berlin
