= Program (machine) =

Set of instructions used to control the behavior of a machine

A program is a set of data or instructions that controls the behavior of a machine. Examples include:

== Mechanisms ==
- The automatic flute player, which was invented in the 9th century by the Banū Mūsā brothers in Baghdad, is the first known example of a programmable machine. The work of the Banu Musa was influenced by their Hellenistic forebears, but it also makes significant improvements over Greek creation. The pinned-barrel mechanism, which allowed for programmable variations in the rhythm and melody of the music, was the key contribution given by the Banu Musa.
- In 1206, the Muslim inventor Ismail al-Jazari (in the Artuqid Sultanate) described a drum machine which may have been an example of a programmable automaton.
- Barrels, punched cards, and music rolls encoding music to be played by player pianos, fairground organs, barrel organs, and music boxes.
- The sequence of punched cards used by a Jacquard loom to produce a given pattern within woven cloth. Invented in 1801, it used holes in punched cards to represent sewing loom arm movements in order to generate decorative patterns automatically.

== Electronics ==
Some programmable equipment and appliances only allow their users to select predefined options and/or set predefined parameters. The user is not required or allowed to write a computer program (textual, visual, or otherwise).

- The "program" of a programmable thermostat consist of user-changeable parameters (mode, time, temperature) in the entries of a schedule.
- The "program" or patch of a programmable music synthesizer adjusts parameters and switches that interconnect modules.
- The "program" of many programmable integrated circuits is data that it permanently stores for retrieval (programmable ROM etc.), and/or govern operation (programmable logic device etc.).

== Computers ==
- A computer program (software) is a list of instructions that can be executed by a computer.

When a programmable computer, programmable calculator, or programmable logic controller executes a program, its processor follows the instructions or commands that the program contains. Each instruction produces effects that alter the state of the machine according to its predefined meaning.

== See also ==
- Program (disambiguation)
- Programmer
