= Deutschlandmuseum =

German museum

- Deutschlandmuseum
- Established: 17 June 2023; 3 years ago
- Location: Leipziger Platz 7, 10117 Berlin
- Coordinates: 52°30′32″N 13°22′42″E
- Director: Robert Rückel
- Website: www.deutschlandmuseum.de

The Deutschlandmuseum is a museum of German history located at Leipziger Platz 7 in the Mitte district of Berlin, Germany. It opened on 17 June 2023. The permanent exhibition is open all year round.

== History ==
Construction of the new museum commenced at the end of 2021 and the museum opened its doors to the public on 17 June 2023. It was conceived by an interdisciplinary team of historians, game developers, graphic designers, educationalists, architects and designers as an interactive and immersive experience of history.

== Management & Design ==
The concept design process for the exhibition was led by the director of the Deutschlandmuseum, Robert Rückel and designer Chris Lange (Creative Studio Berlin). Robert Rückel is responsible for the permanent exhibitions in the neighbouring German Spy Museum (2018) and previously led the team at the DDR Museum (2006).

Chris Lange has co-designed a range of visitor attractions in Europa Park (Golden Ticket Award for Pirates in Batavia 2020), Shrek's Adventure in London, the Legoland Discovery Center and the Rulantica water park (Thea Award 2020, Leading Edge Award 2020). Lange has been a key actor in the experience industry for more than 20 years and is considered an innovation driver.

Jonas Kartenbeck and Constantin Bänfer provided support for the graphic and media design. They were responsible for the design of the German Spy Museum and the DDR Museum.

== The Exhibition ==
=== Overview ===
The Deutschlandmuseum deploys a range of innovative media technology to curate an interactive exhibition. The 1400 m^{2} permanent exhibition presents defining moments from twelve epochs of German history. Beginning in the forest of Germania in 9 AD, the visitor is introduced to the Battle of the Teutoburg Forest. Other historical periods to feature include the Holy Roman Empire of the German Nation in the Middle Ages, Martin Luther and the Reformation, the Thirty Years’ War, the German thinkers of the Enlightenment, the path to German national unification in the 19th century, the two world wars, the division of Germany into East and West during the Cold War and the development of Germany after Reunification.

=== Special Features / 4D Museum ===
The permanent exhibition of the Deutschlandmuseum provides an overview of 2000 years of German history. Deploying a mix of interactive media and original exhibits, it provides its visitors with a 4D immersive experience. The exhibition features detailed recreations of historical settings, including medieval battlements, a printer’s workshop and a World War I trench. The museum creates a multi-sensory experience by incorporating odours, soundscapes and other stimuli. This involves various elements such as floorboards in a medieval castle that creak when walked upon, the reproduction of a forest, the smell of gas in a reproduction World War I trench, a brightly-lit shopping arcade from the “roaring twenties” and an S-Bahn carriage. The use of such elements brings the character of an adventure park to a museum setting. The museum seeks to address a target audience of families with children. Whilst placing interactivity and fun in the foreground, its stated aim is to engage with central aspects of German history in an academically rigorous manner.

== Gallery ==
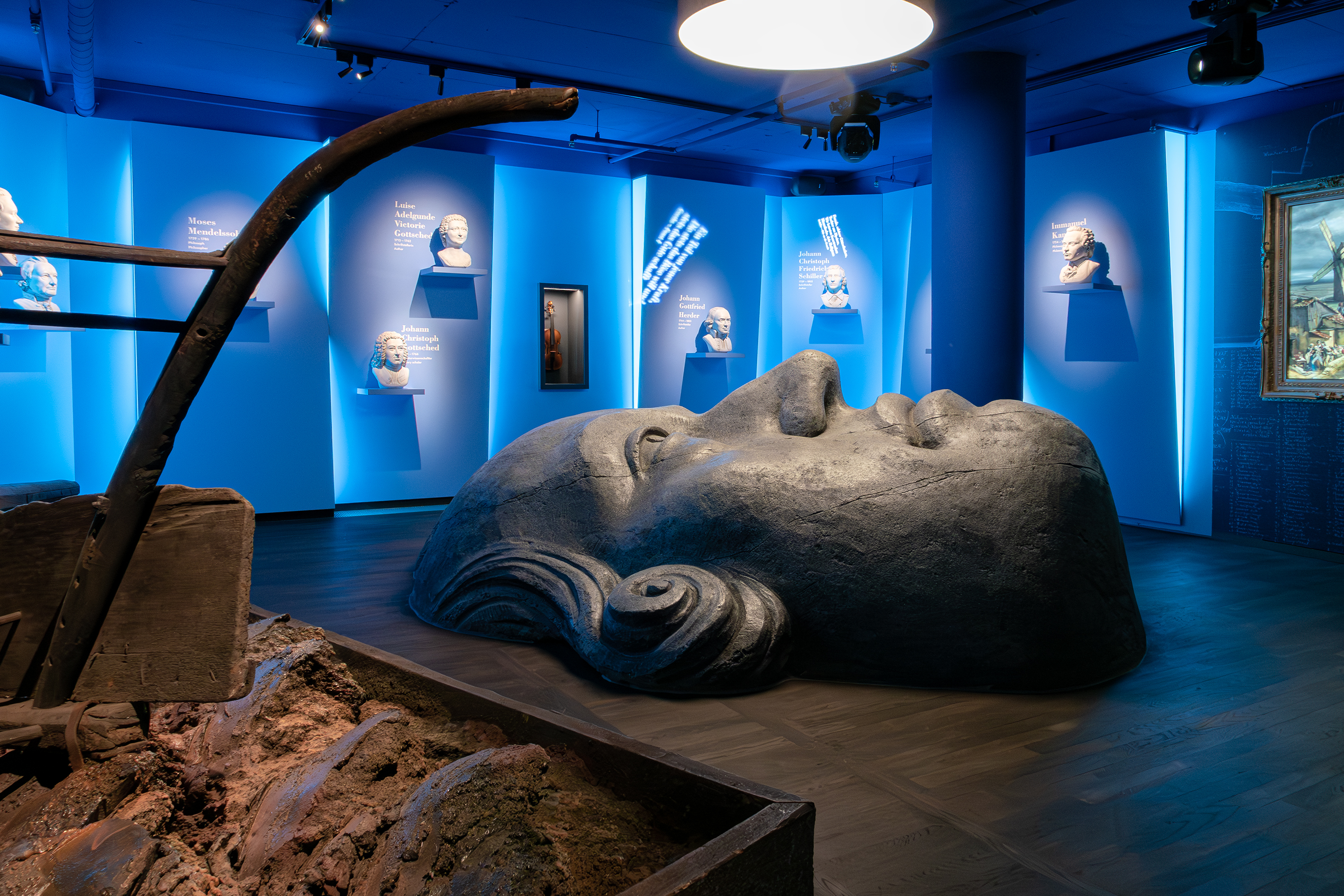

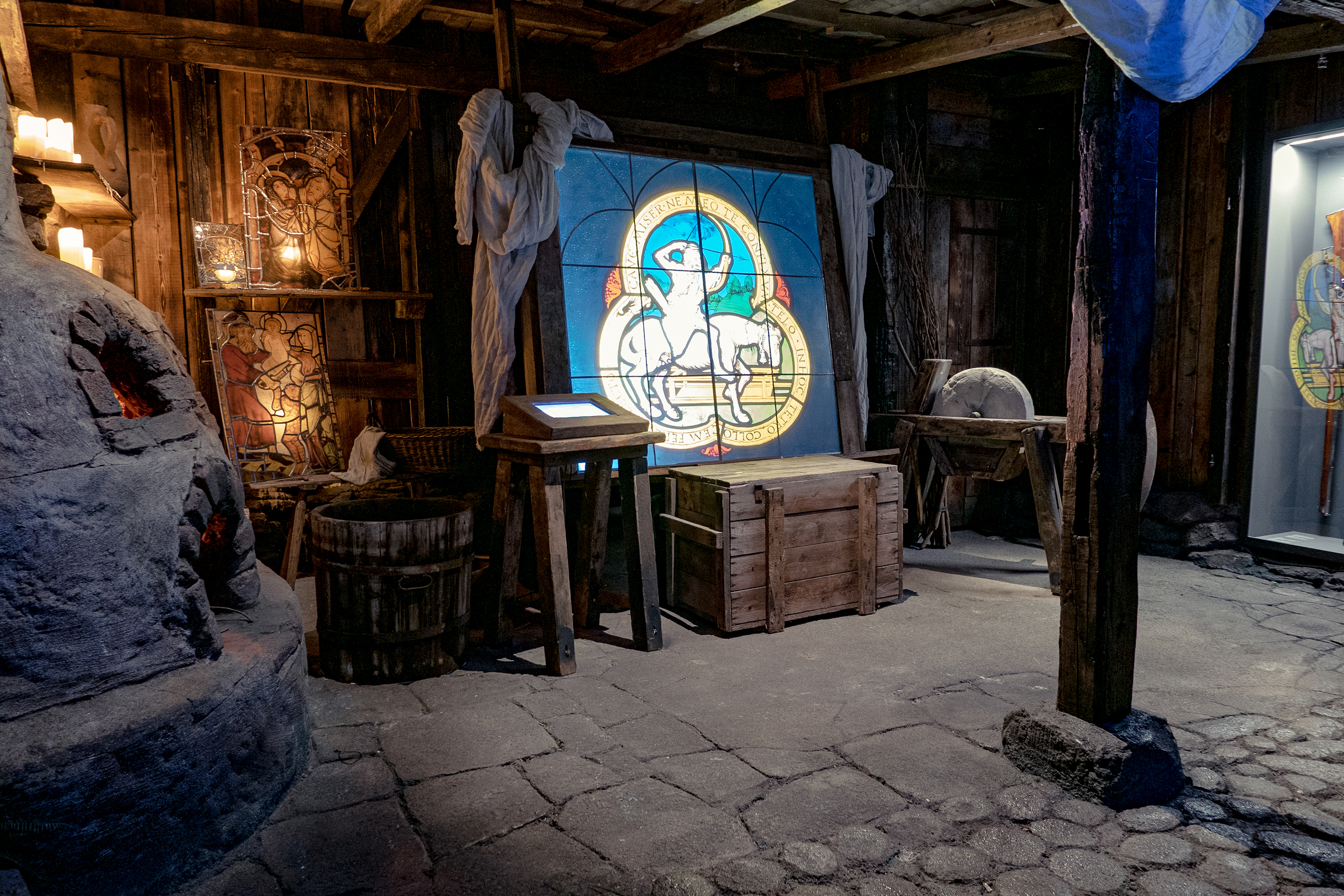

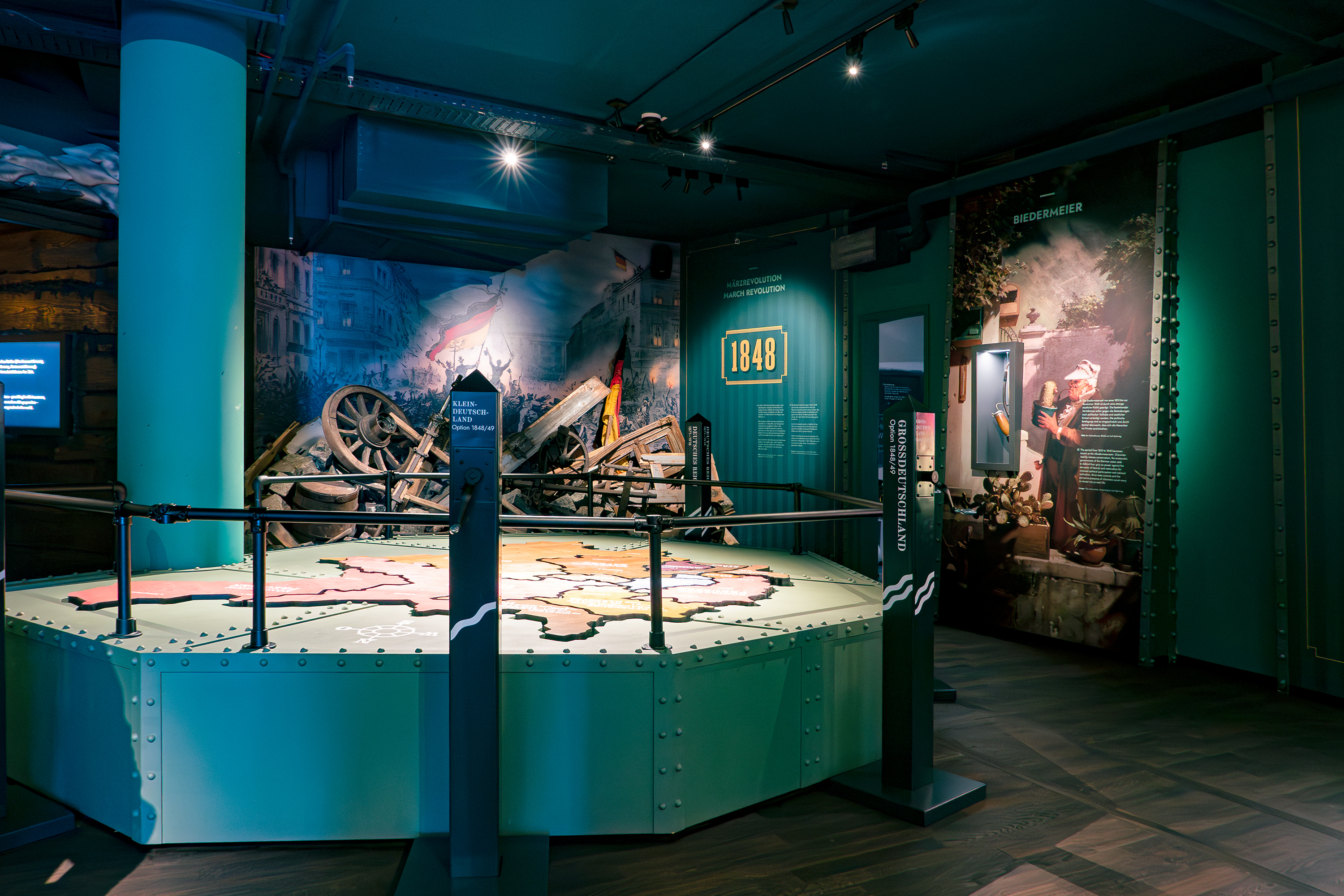

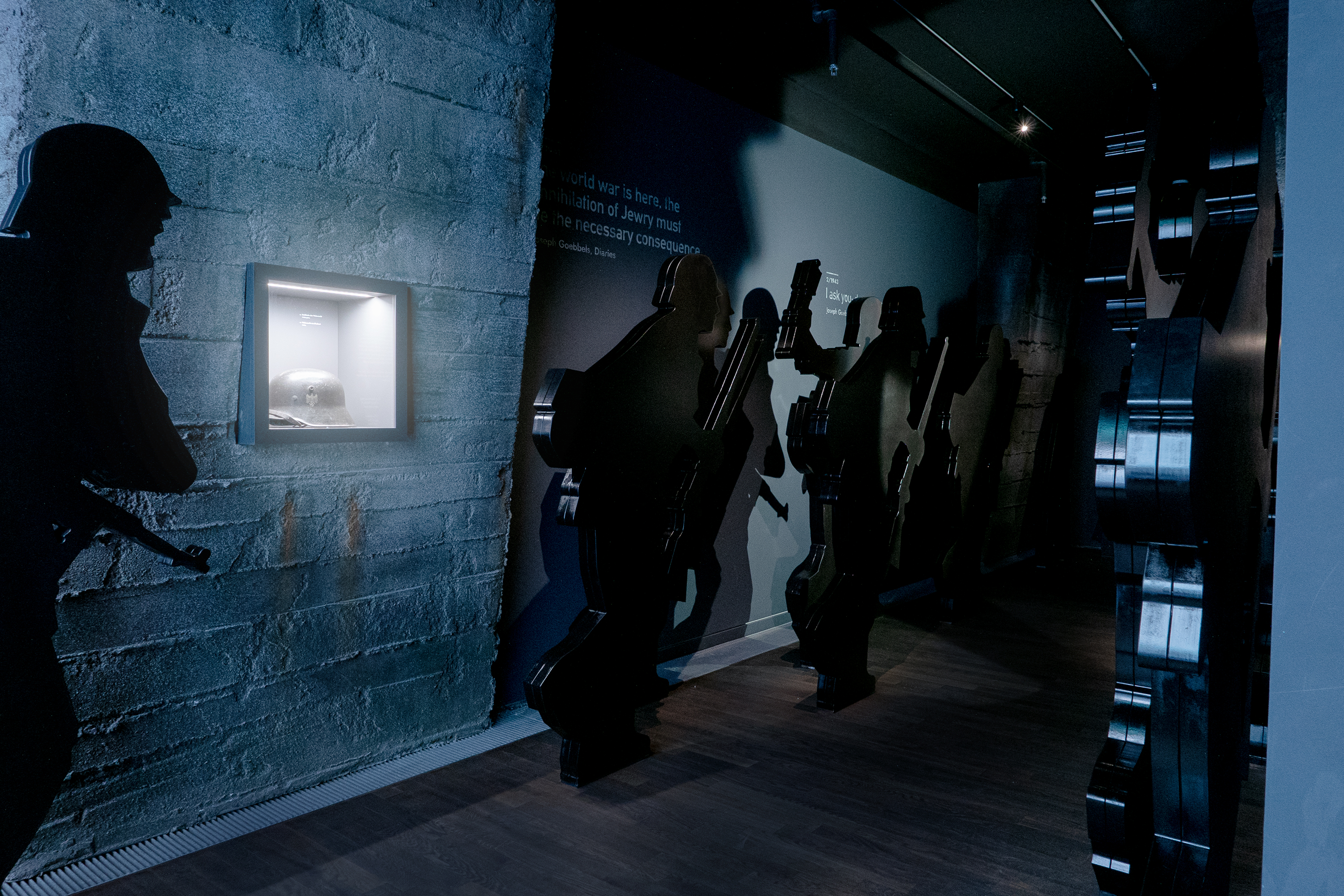

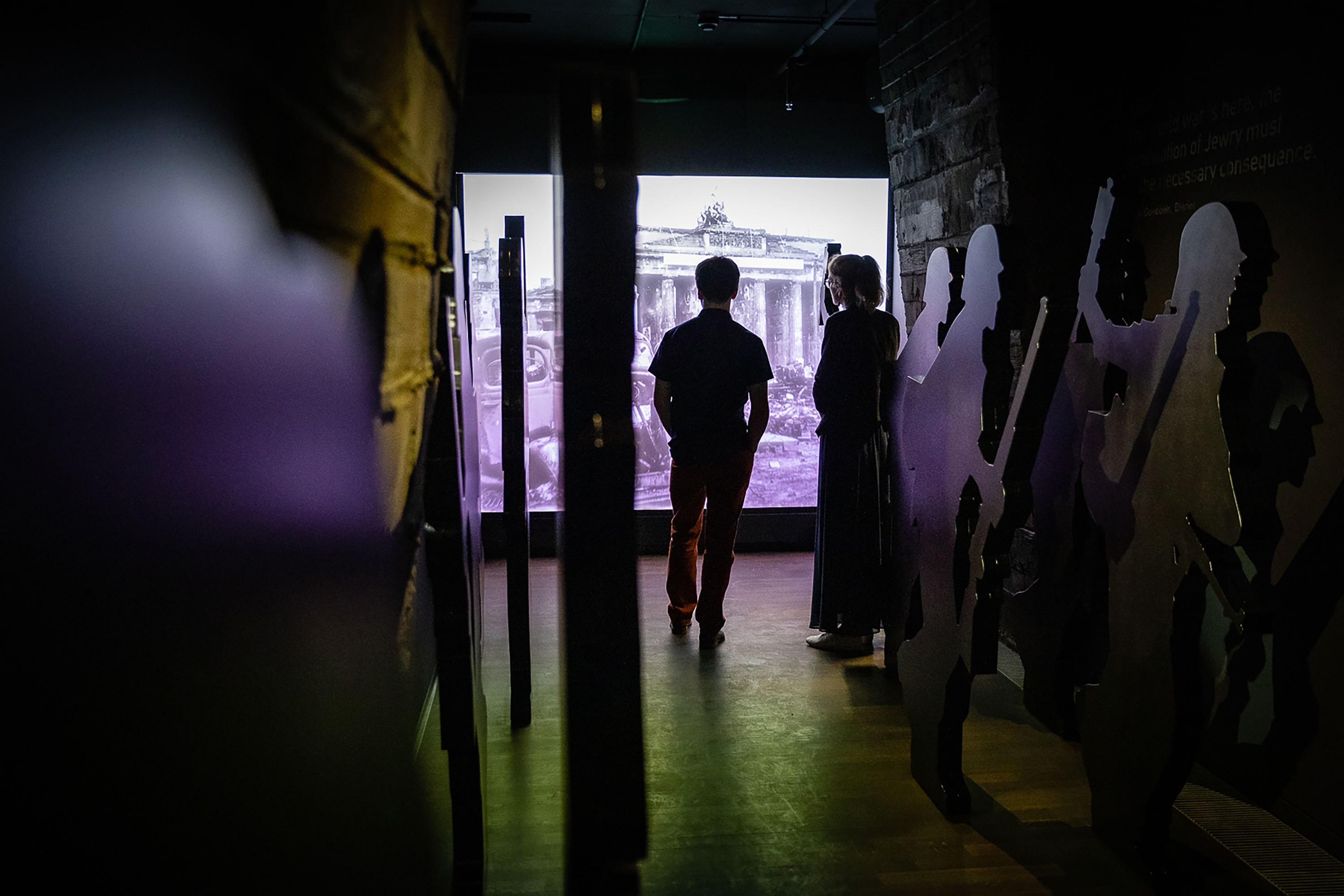

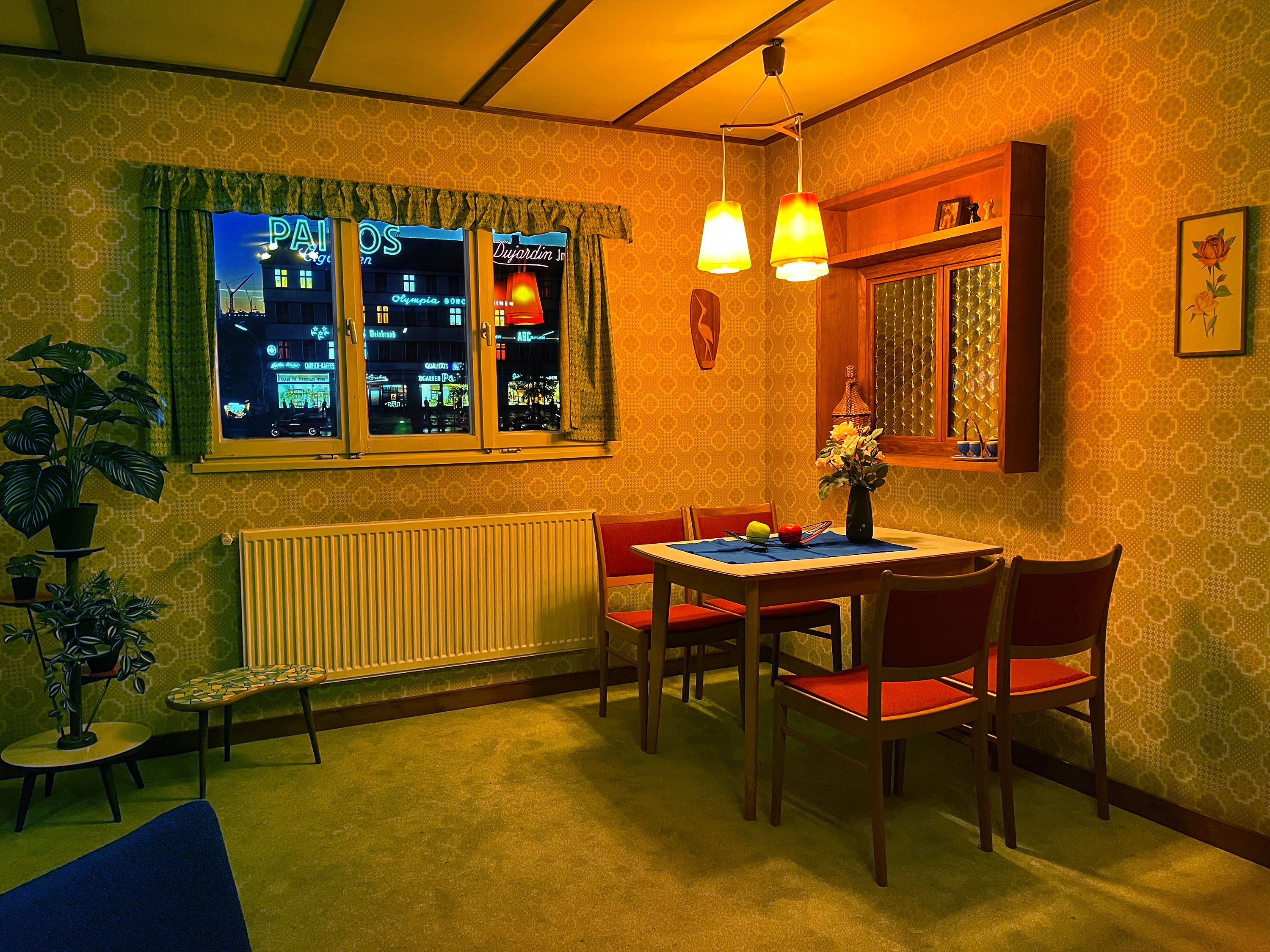

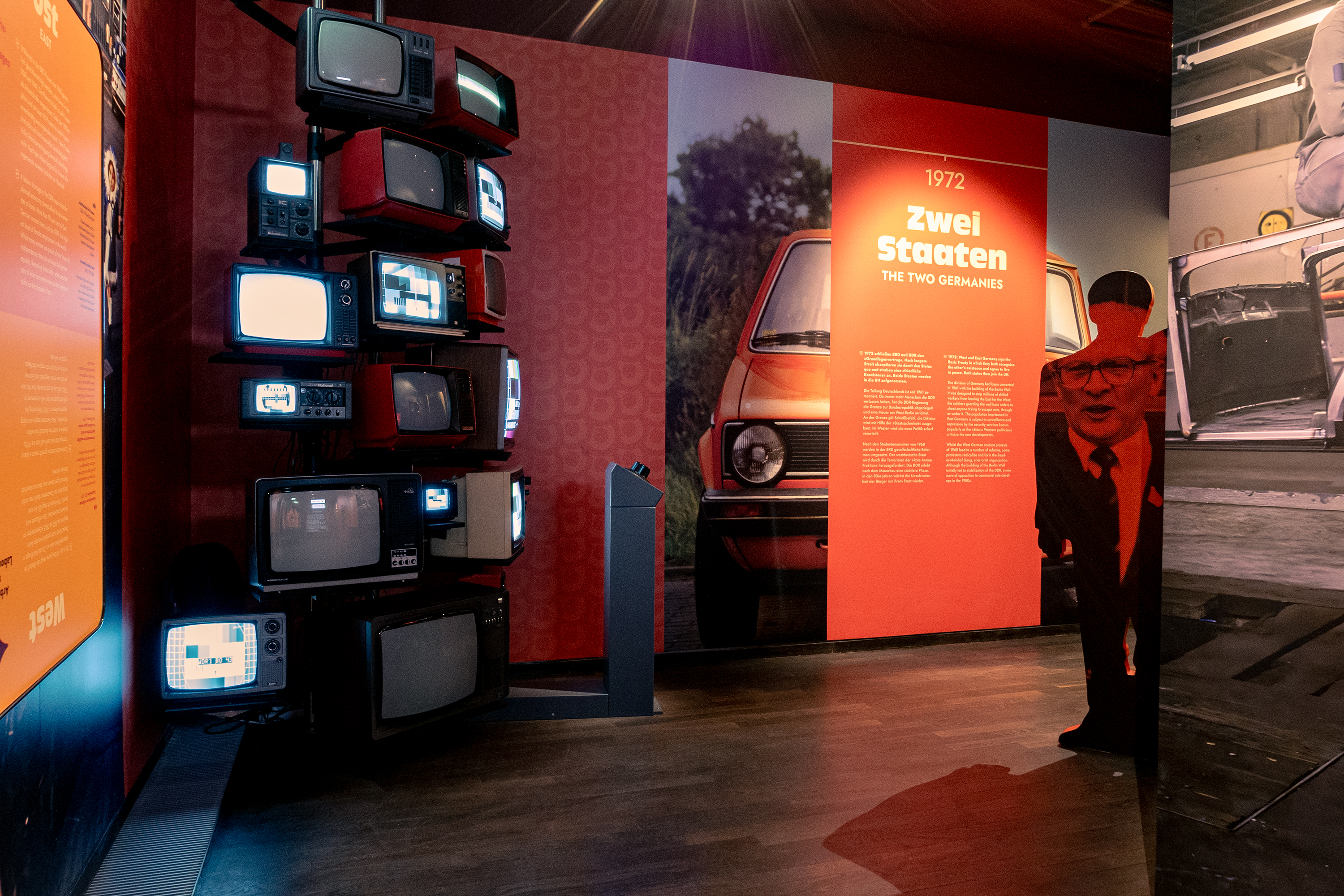

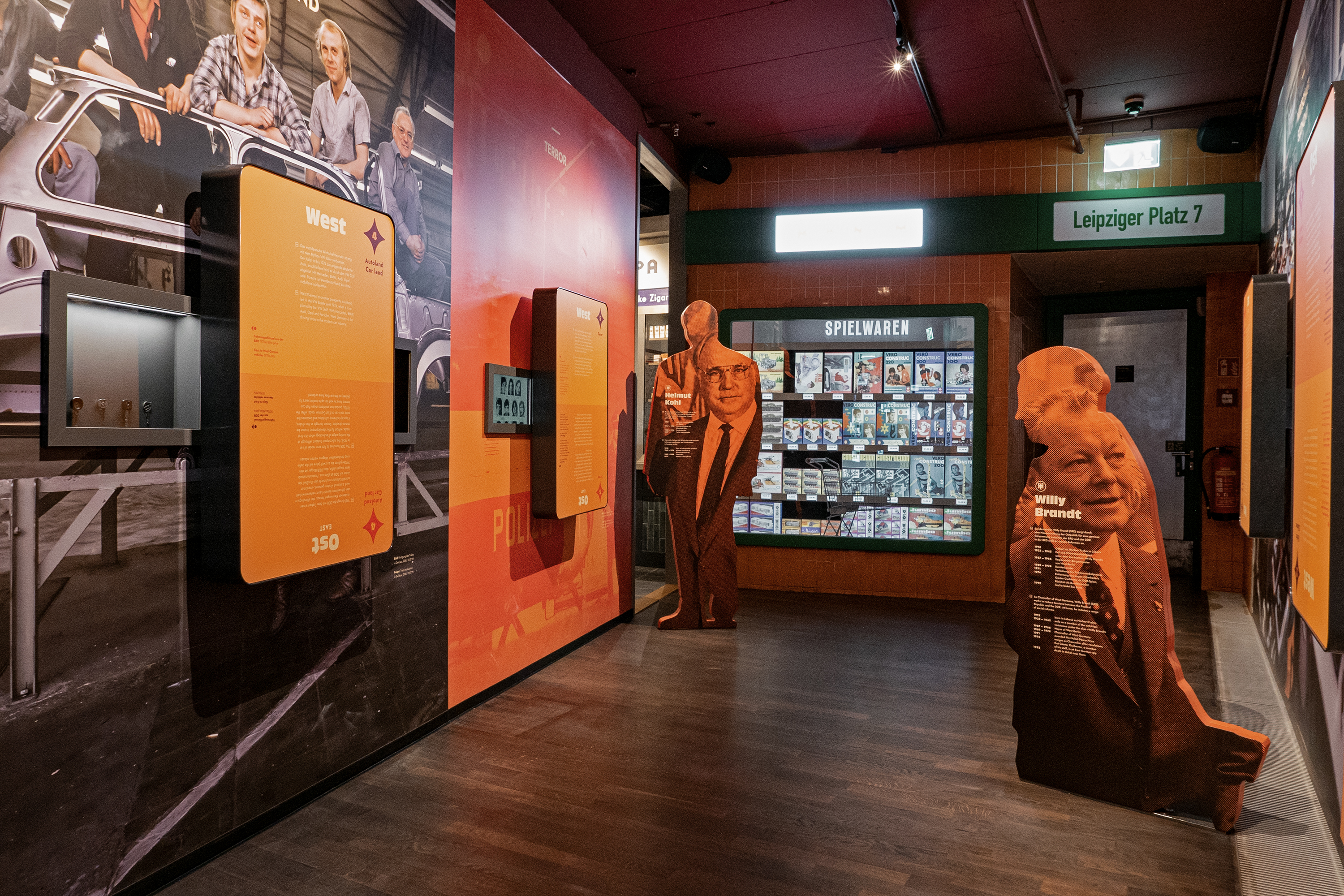

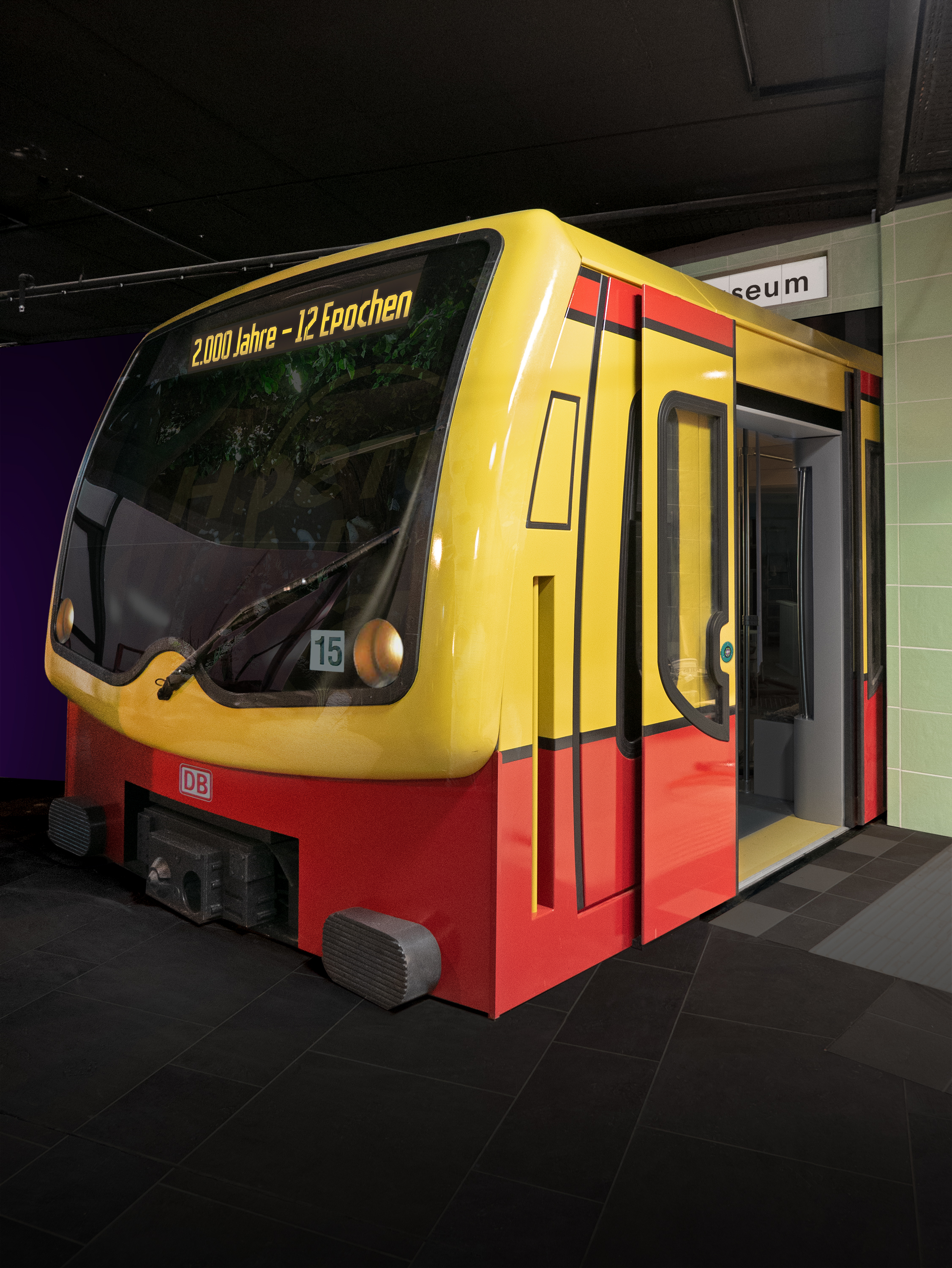
