= The Program =

The Program or The Programme may refer to:

- The Program (1993 film), an American film about college football directed by David S. Ward
- The Program (2015 film), an American biopic about Lance Armstrong directed by Stephen Frears
- The Program (album), a 1998 album by the British band Marion
- The Program (novel), a 2004 novel by Gregg Hurwitz
- The Program: Cons, Cults, and Kidnapping, a 2024 true crime documentary series on Netflix about the troubled teen industry
- The Programme, a comic book miniseries published by Wildstorm

== See also ==
- Program (disambiguation)
