= Designpanoptikum =

Coordinates: 52.5282°N 13.3909°E

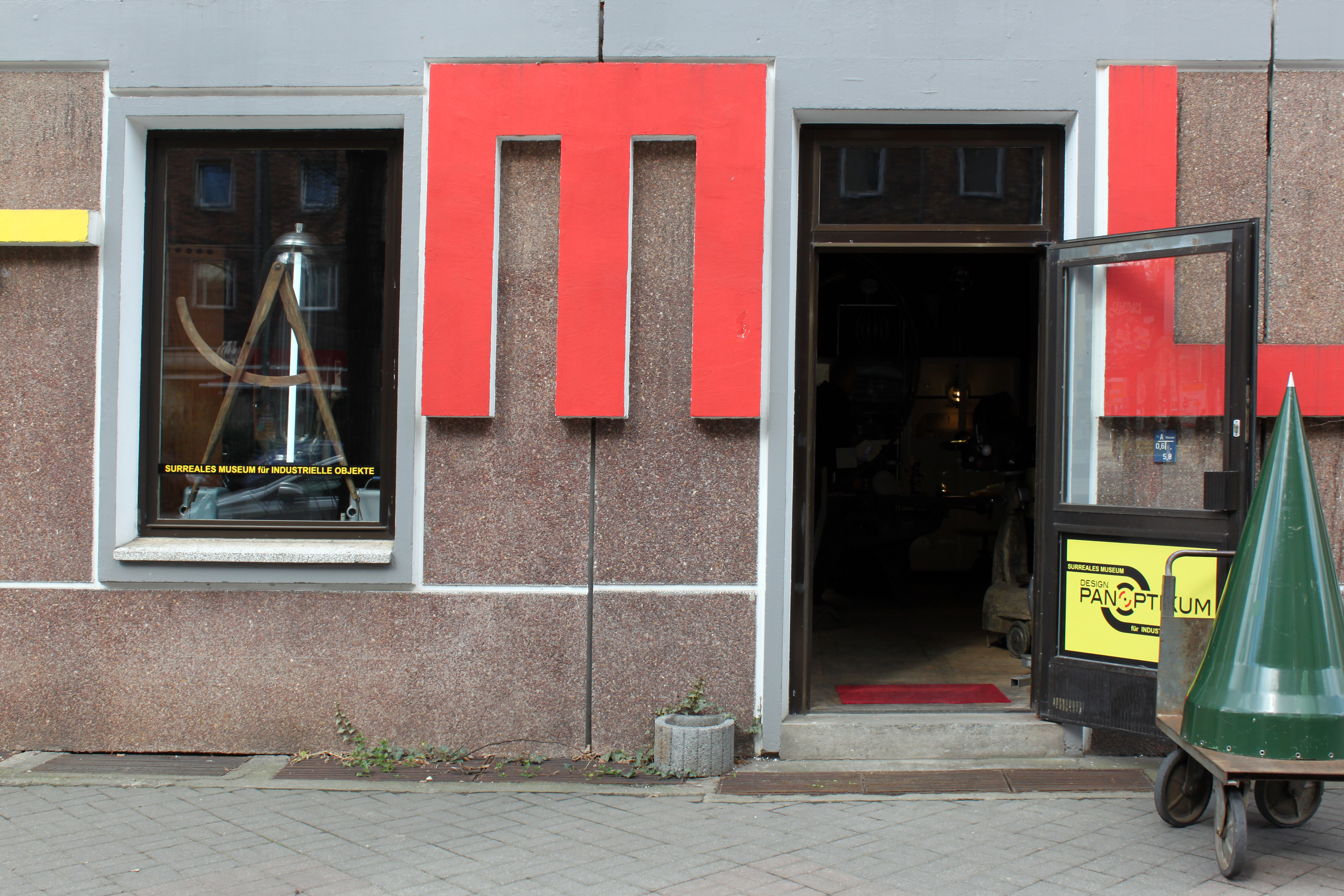
- Designpanoptikum - Surreal Museum of Industrial Objects, Berlin
- Location: Berlin, Germany
- Type: Surrealist museum of industrial objects

Designpanoptikum is a "surrealist museum of industrial objects", featuring a huge collection of technological objects, gathered and arranged by Vlad Korneev in Berlin, Germany. The museum is located in Poststraße 7, 10178 Berlin in the historical center of Berlin-Mitte, the Nikolaiviertel and very close to the Nikolaikirche.

== The exhibition: a chamber of wonders ==
The historical museum features utilitarian objects from the fields of medicine, film, sports, aviation, construction and industry. The focus is less on individual objects, but their arrangement and compilation. The reduction of light and the connection of objects with different rooms aim to create a large, walk-through installation. The exhibits are intentionally devoid of descriptions and instead focuses on the interaction of form and function of the items. Visitors are encouraged to handle the objects and speculate on their use.

The museum also features the Lichtbildpanoptikum, an integrated photo gallery featuring works by Vlad Korneev.

== Notable items ==
- Film projectors from Zeiss Ikon
- Reproduction camera the company Fold & Werner from Leipzig
- Two identical film projectors from the Party School of the SED of Meopta
- Plate camera
- Iron Lung
- Ejection seat of the company Martin-Baker
- Operating tables from Maquet

== History ==
The museum originates from Korneevs complex collection of rare utility objects from various centuries. While he worked as first assistant for Werner Bokelberg in Hamburg, he began to gather unusual props for his photographies. Originally, the museum was located as a shop-museum in Schwerin, managed by Korneev. On the 4th of November 2010 he opened the Designpanoptikum in Torstraße 201, Berlin. 2017 the exhibition moved into a larger exhibition space, located in Poststraße 7, Nikolaiviertel, where it is opened until this day.
