= The Kennedys (museum) =

Private museum in Berlin, Germany

Coordinates: 52°31′35″N 13°23′40″E

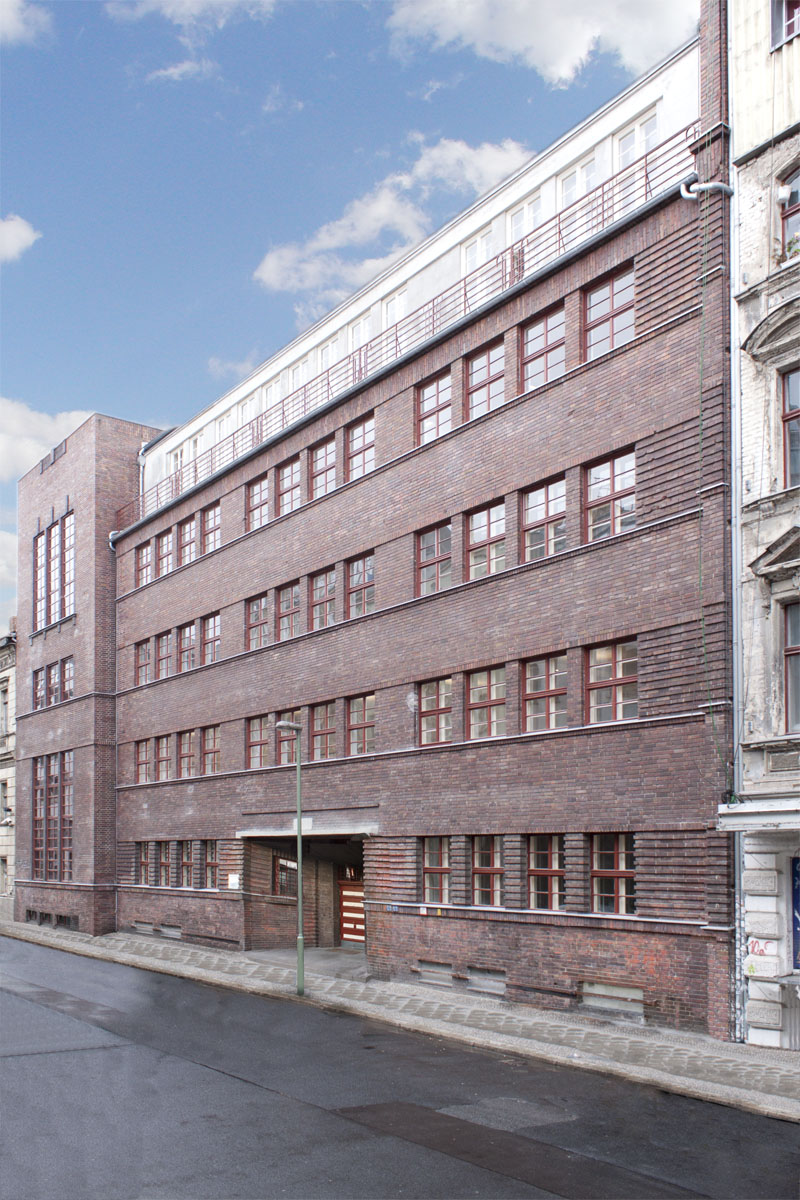
The Kennedys Museum in Berlin.

The Kennedys, Berlin

The Kennedys (German: Das Museum The Kennedys) is a private museum in Berlin, Germany. It is located at Auguststraße 11-13 and displays documents from the lives of the Kennedy family.

The Kennedys has one of the world's most comprehensive collection of photographs, official documents, private papers and holding pieces of the Kennedy family. Approximately 300 photographs and objects are on display, many of which were formerly owned by the Kennedy family.

Since 2013 the museum is located in the building of the former "Jüdische Mädchenschule Berlin" (Jewish Girl School Berlin).
