= Program (German non-profit) =

Program e.V., Berlin
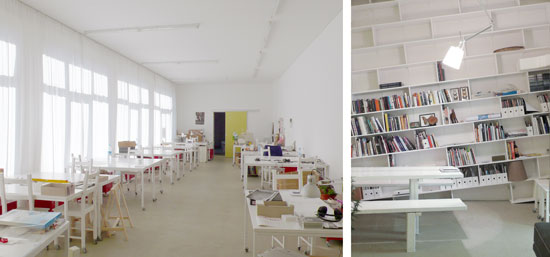
- View of the office and library
- Formation: 2006
- Website: www.programonline.de

Program is a German non-profit initiative that aims to expand the disciplinary boundaries of architecture through its collaboration with other fields. Based in Berlin, the project was founded in 2006 by Carson Chan (born 1980 in Hong Kong) and Fotini Lazaridou-Hatzigoga (born 1979 in Thessaloniki, Greece). Program has been providing a discursive platform for artists, architects, critics and curators to explore new ideas through exhibitions, performances, workshops, lectures and residencies. Exhibitions represent a large part of Program's mandate for expanding the current understanding of architecture, both theoretically and in practice. After six years of programing, PROGRAM closed its Berlin location in 2012.
