= Berlin Spy Museum =

German Spy Museum
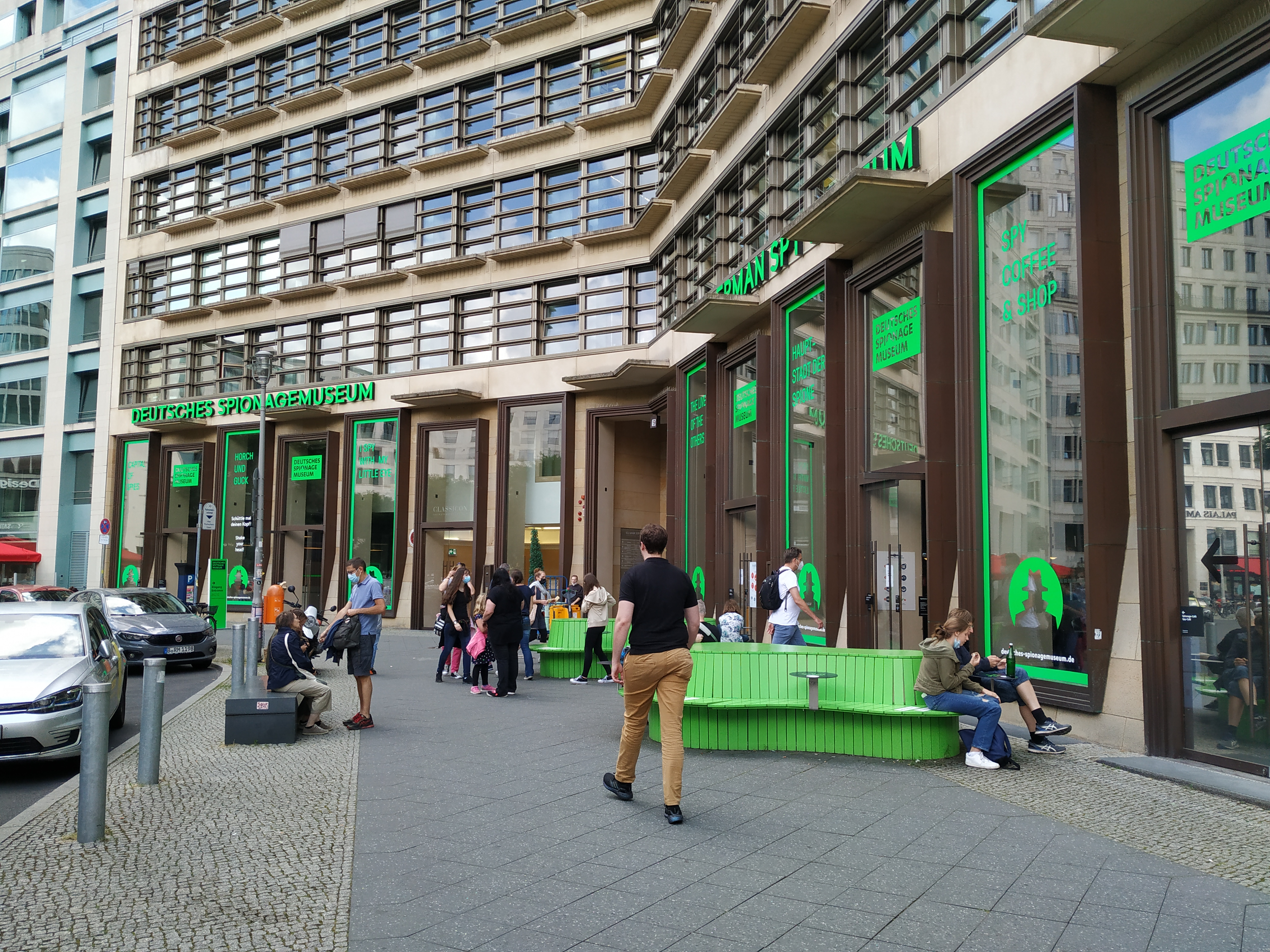
- Former name: The Berlin Spy Museum
- Established: 19 September 2015
- Location: Leipziger Pl. 9, 10117 Berlin, Germany
- Coordinates: 52°30′32″N 13°22′44″E
- Type: Spy Museum
- Director: Franz-Michael Günther
- Architect: Frank Wittmer
- Public transit access: U-Bahn and S-Bahn station Potsdamer Platz
- Website: www.deutsches-spionagemuseum.de/en

The Berlin Spy Museum is a private museum in Berlin which was created by former journalist Franz-Michael Günther. The museum opened to the public on 19 September 2015. Günther's aspirations were to create a museum devoted to the history of spies and espionage in the former spy capital of Germany. The museum is located in the central area of Potsdamer Platz, formerly known as the "death strip", as it lies on the perimeters of the wall which once divided East and West Berlin. The museum acts as an educational institution, with its permanent exhibitions bridging together centuries of espionage stories and tactics, immersing visitors in a multi-media experience. The museum particularly focuses on the World Wars and the Cold War through a range of a 1000 different exhibits and artefacts. Since its opening in 2015, 1,000,000 people have visited the museum and recently in 2020 it was nominated for the European Museum of the Year Award. The Berlin Spy Museum is partnered with the International Spy Museum in Washington, D.C., and many of the artefacts and installations within the museum have captured media attention around the world.

== History ==
Before its construction, many sites for the Berlin Spy Museum were considered such as the famous Hackeschen Höfe, the Forum Museumsinsel (also known as Museum Island) and the Prinzessinnenpalais Unter den Linden. Günther's final decision on the location of the museum was in the city centre of Berlin at Leipziger Platz, as "no place symbolises the Cold War more than Berlin". Located on the previous division between East and West Berlin, the museum is positioned in a popular spot, surrounded by other tourist destinations like the Martin-Gropius-Bau, the Brandenburg Gate, Potsdamer Platz, the Bundesrat of Germany, Topography of Terrors and the Kulturforum with the Philharmonie and Neuer Nationalgalerie.

The museums original building was constructed for a logistics company. After the building was bought, serious renovations needed to be completed to it in order for it to turn into a museum. The architecture of the museum was designed by Frank Wittmer and was inspired by the Glienicker Bridge, which ran over the Havel River, bordering East and West Berlin. The Glienicker Bridge was a crucial location during the Cold War as it was used to exchange spies from East and West Germany, becoming known as "the bridge of spies". Following renovations, the museum opened on 19 September 2015, 25 years after the end of the Cold War. Shortly after the museums opening, the business encountered some financial issues with its innovative funding model, resulting in its temporary closure. After some careful planning to improve the financial concept of the museum, it reopened on 29 July 2016 as the "German Spy Museum".

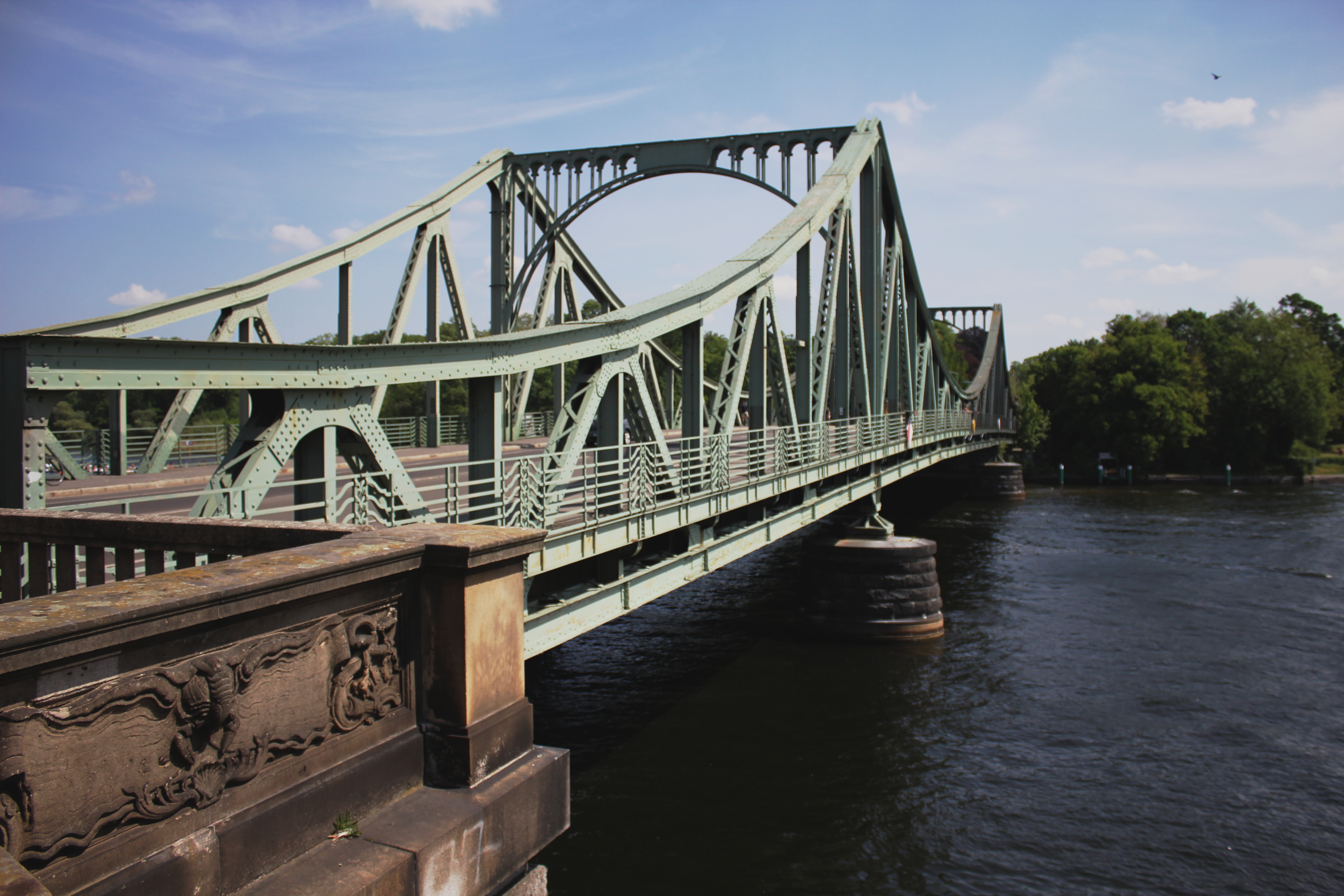
Glienicker bridge

Prior to his creation of the Berlin Spy Museum, curator Franz-Michael Günther worked as a television journalist reporting on the war on terror which was a campaign to eliminate terrorism following the 11 September attacks. During his research Günther had an unexpected encounter with the East German Stasi under Communism which inspired him to discover more about the pre-history of spies. From 2004, Günther's passion for spying expanded, resulting in him collecting and planning the creation of the Berlin spy museum. Günther collected historically significant artefacts from former secret service workers and contemporary witnesses to create a museum dedicated to spying and espionage, which was once at the city of Berlin's centre. The museum creates an educational experience for visitors and aims to demonstrate an objective, non-biased perspective of espionage throughout history.

== Exhibitions ==
The main topics of the exhibitions within the museum are:

1. The History of Espionage from Ancient times until the Present Age
2. World War I
3. World War II
4. Cryptology, Morse, Radio
5. Cold War (Secret services in East and West Germany)
6. Spy Gear
7. Spy Training
8. Listening Devices
9. Spy Cameras
10. Animals Used as Spies e.g. pigeons
11. Conspiracy Theories and Espionage (RAF-Stasi Connection / The Case Uwe Barschel)
12. Glienicke Bridge (Spy exchanges)
13. Secret Services and Poison
14. 007 – Espionage in Movies
15. Double Agents
16. Secret Service Operations
17. Espionage in Present and Future

The museum was designed to educate its visitors through its hands-on, interactive exhibits in the 3.000 m^{2} (32.000 sq ft) exhibition space. The exhibitions within the museum were designed by Bänfer Kartenbeck. Garamantis and Arts Electronica companies helped create and conceive the leading edge and high-tech multimedia exhibits and interactive models in the museum.

The exhibits are positioned in chronological order, creating a physical timeline that visitors can walk through, beginning with secret scriptures from antiquity and ending with the recent NSA debate. The 10-meter long timeline creates a grand introduction for visitors through presenting the historical developments of spying from ancient Egypt all the way up until WW1. Secret agents and coding belong to some of the oldest professions in the world which is displayed through the exhibits on the cipher technique invented by Julius Caesar, and the secret service methods of Oliver Cromwell. Visitors can also read about personal stories from witnesses, such as the murder of the Bulgarian dissident Georgi Markov in 1978 with a poisoned umbrella.

The entrance to the museum has security cameras peering down on the visitors, setting the scene for the entire facility as substantive focus of the exhibition is on data acquisition in the Internet Age. These security cameras highlight the issue of surveillance, data and security which effects every individual in the modern world of the 21st century. Interactive activities in the museum have the ability to stimulate visitors’ senses so that they feel fully immersed in the experience.

=== Garamantis ===
Garamantis is a business that was founded in Berlin in 2014 by a group of software developers. Garamantis designs and invents interactive installations like the multi-touch scanner table and the interactive multi-touch display case which are used in the Berlin Spy Museum. The business aims to create leading edge technology in order to modernise museums in the digital age. Creating digital and interactive technology in museums also enhances their prestige and allows them to appeal to a wider audience.

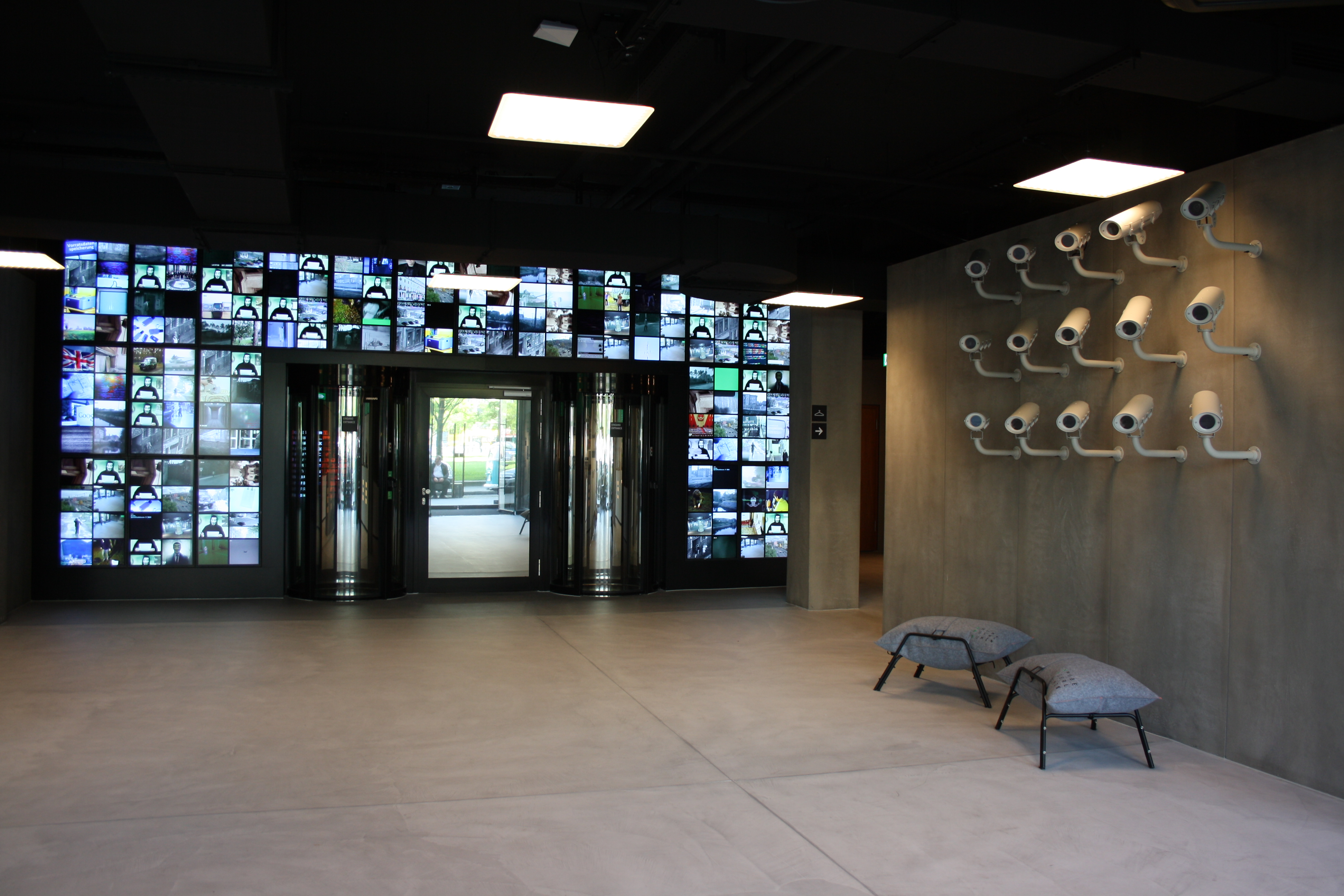
The "Spywatch" wall

Garamantis invented all the interactive technologies and a software system for the Berlin Spy Museum, in collaboration with designs from arts electronica. The high-tech designs are displayed on 200 screens throughout the museum. The museum contains a large display-wall called the "Spy Watch" that plays more than 150 videos simultaneously

As curator of the museum, Franz-Michael Günther decision to collaborate with Garamantis to create the museum allowed his complex vision to be created. Günther said "Garamantis's ideas and networks, like the interactive display cases, have opened up new and innovative ways of presentation for our exhibition concept" resulting in their designs becoming a part of the permanent exhibition.

=== Multimedia activities ===
The multimedia activities in the museum are presented on 200 different HD-screens and projections. The museum holds a range of activities that involve guests both physically and intellectually such as:

- Morse code stations which are positioned in the WWI section of the museum and allows visitors to send secret messages through Morse code.
- Encoding and decoding messages through the rotor-based cipher machine Enigma. Visitors are able to communicate and decipher codes with other guests, whilst also learning about the history of these old type writers.
- Quiz stations which test the visitor's knowledge of spying and conspiracy theories.
- Facebook puzzles which expose how much information Facebook beholds on its users and what happens with our information. Visitors can also check the security of their passwords through a Password Hacker that tests the strength of a user's password.

=== Hands-on exhibits ===
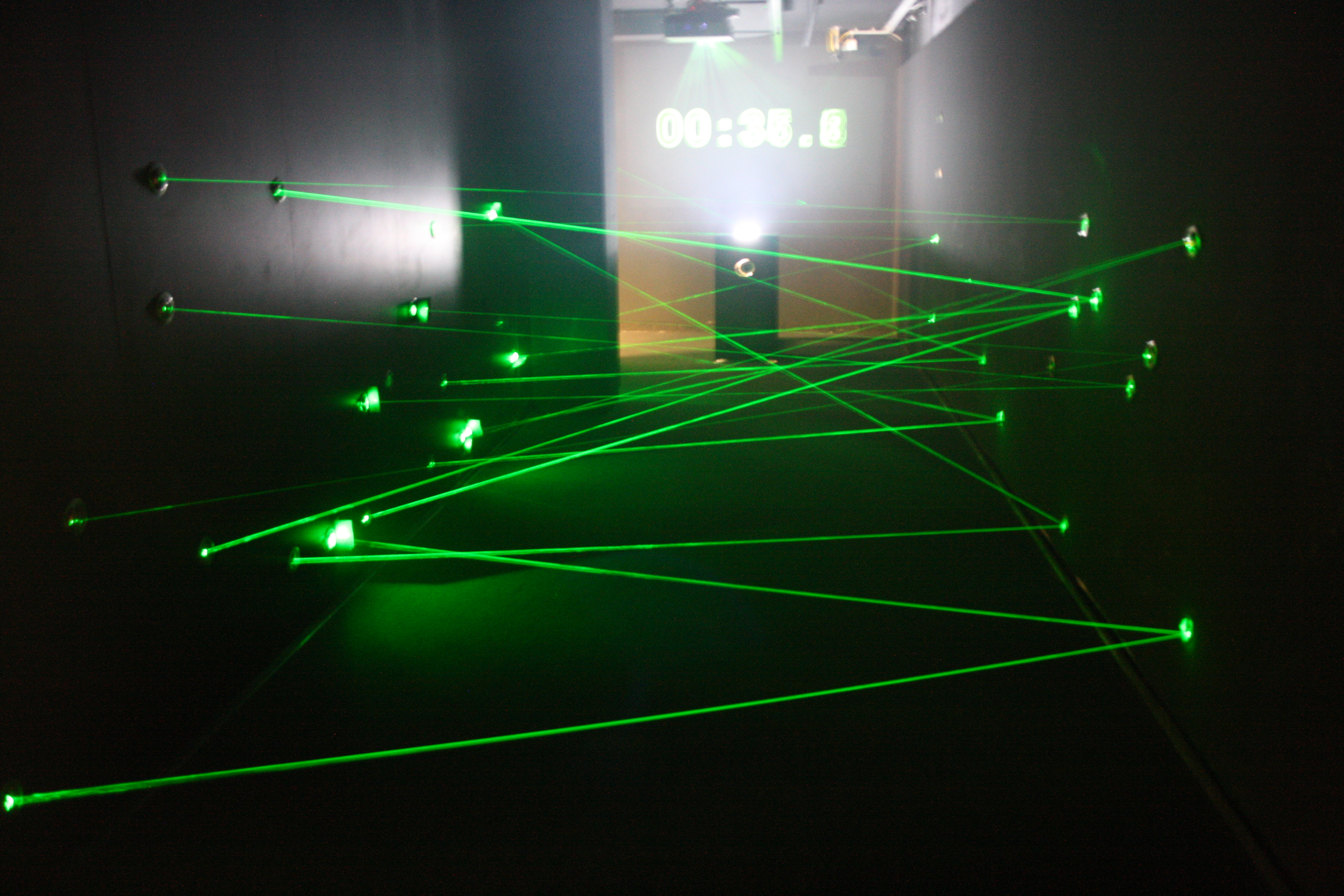
Laser Obstacle Course

- Bug detectors: visitors are put under a time limit to try and find listening devices in a room using a bug detector. A replica of an office is created to try make the activity as real as possible.
- Laser maze: visitors become physically tested through the laser maze obstacle course. The tricky course relates to the challenges many spies are faced with in spy films. Visitors are able to try to complete the course themselves through finding the most efficient way through the laser maze without touching a light beam. Spectators can watch other visitors of the museum manage their way through the maze via thermal imaging cameras and motion detectors.
- Reconstructing files: visitors piece back bits of a puzzle to try and make sense of destroyed documents

=== Spying during the Cold War ===
The Berlin Spy Museum is focused on major historical events such as the building of the Berlin Wall and the Berlin Blockade. The Museum has a number of exhibits, installations and artefacts about such events. Spying has been around since ancient times including in the Cold War, "if the Great War belonged to the soldier in the trenches, the Cold War surely belonged to the spy". The notion of spying involves "entering an opponent's zone under false pretences to get information". In 1945, the city of Berlin was split between the NATO powers and the USSR, making it a frontier for the Cold War and eventually becoming known as the international capital of espionage. Owing to the continuous growth of arsenal between the two superpowers during the Cold War, there was an aim to move towards a more peaceful and secure world. The Cold War was not a traditional war in the sense of guns and weapons. It used spies and espionage as a method of "indirect war". The Cold War saw old warfare tactics being substituted with modernised tactics and technologies such as spying and nuclear weapons. Information and knowledge became the most important and resourceful weapon during the Cold War, which led to the creation of sophisticated methods of spying such as Operation Gold. Operation Gold involved the British and American intelligence organisations creating tunnels underneath the soviet occupied zone of East Berlin to try and tap into their telephone wires and gather information on the enemy.

=== The Stasi ===
The State Security Service called the "Stasi" emerged in the establishment of the German Democratic Republic (GDR) in 1949. The Stasi was a secret police organisation that closely monitored the activity of their citizens, and other states. In order to assert their power and dominance in the GDR, the Stasi used a vast network of civilians to spy on each other in order to collect information on suspects. By the 1950s the Stasi had developed a huge network of 274,000 employed spies and agents.

=== Berlin in the Cold War ===
Berlin was considered "the most valuable base in the world for espionage against the Soviet Bloc until the construction of the Berlin Wall in 1961". Half of the British Secret Intelligence Service (M16) total strength was concentrated in Berlin at the end of the 1950s. The construction of the Berlin Wall in 1961 was built to stop the migration wave from Socialism to Capitalism. Following the construction of the Berlin Wall espionage became more difficult for spies who formerly travelled from East to West Berlin to gather information, resulting in them having to modernise their espionage tactics to use a more technical approach. The construction of the Berlin Wall also initiated the Berlin Blockade which saw the USSR, in June 1948, cut off resources entering the western half of Berlin (Van Tonder 2017). In response to this, the US flew cargo plans with resources over the Berlin Wall to sustain the city.

== Artifacts ==
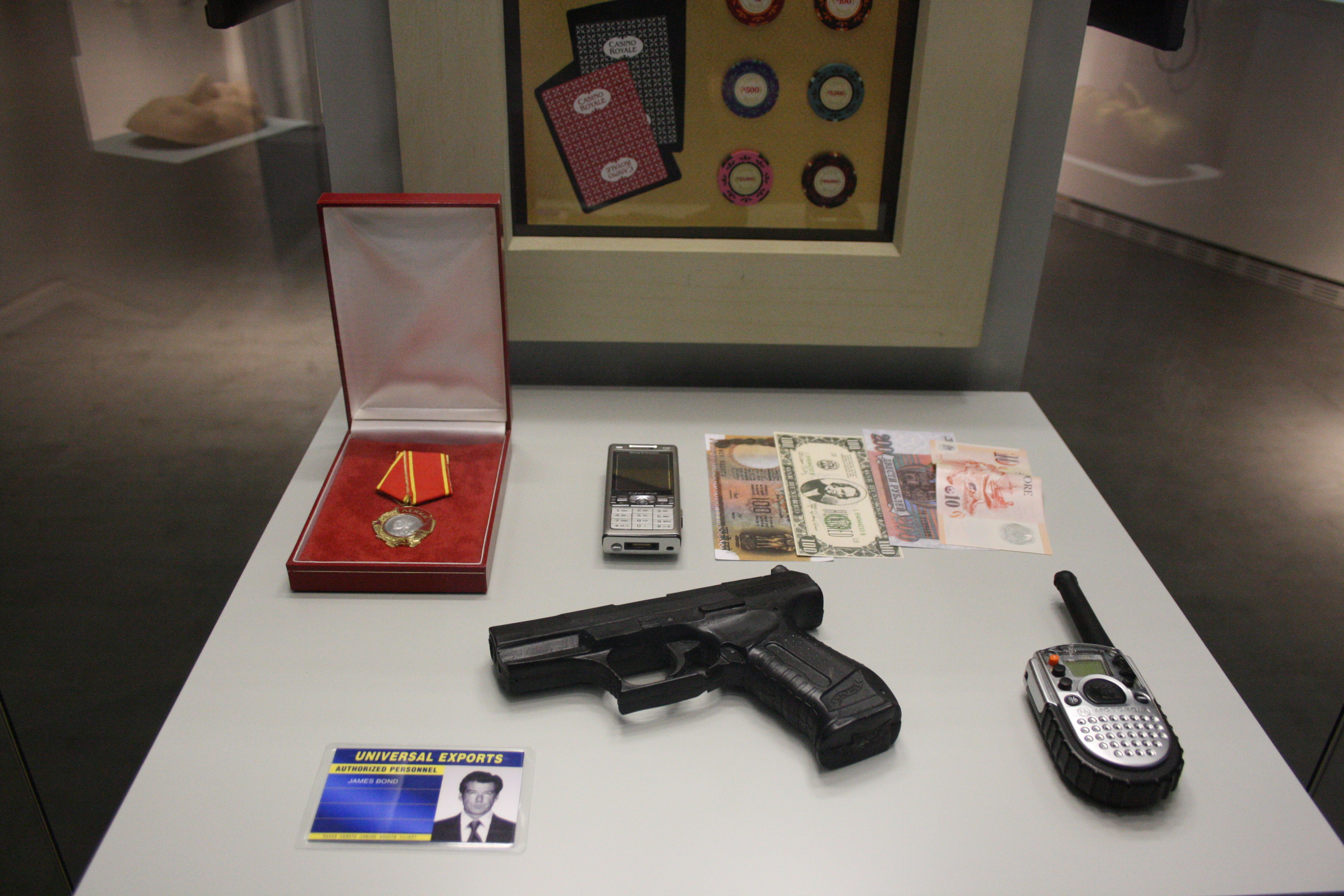
James Bond props

Original artifacts have been collected over the years and realistic replicas have been created to expose visitors to methods and tactics used by spies and secret services throughout history. The artefacts were sourced by the curators and historians of the museum, with many of the replicas being collected form the props used in James Bond films. The Berlin Spy Museum has accumulated a collection of artefacts, particularly on WWII and the Cold War:

=== 'Fialka' the Russian cipher machine ===
The Fialka is an electro-mechanical rotor cipher machine created by the USSR in the 1950s and was used during the Cold War. Most of the machines have been destroyed, but one of the remaining Fialkas is on display at the Berlin Spy Museum. The Fialka encrypts and decodes messages written in Cyrillic onto paper. The cipher machine is similar to the Enigma device that was used to protect commercial, diplomatic and military communication during World War II. The design of the Fialka is largely based on the Enigma design, although the Fialka exposes some of Enigma's flaws and weaknesses.

=== Bulgarian Umbrella ===
Georgi Markov was a Bulgarian writer and critic of communism. On 7 September 1978 the author believed he was shot with poison in London by a man with an umbrella who was associated with the KGB. In hospital doctors found a small metallic pellet containing the poison ‘ricin’ in Markov's right thigh which was the cause of his death. However, following further research it was discovered that Markov was not killed via the ‘Bulgarian umbrella’ but the poison was injected into him via a smaller murder weapon. A reconstruction of this killer umbrella is displayed at the Berlin Spy Museum. This event caused a climax in the secret intelligence operations during the Cold War, with the ‘Bulgarian Umbrella’ turning into a "synonym for cold-blooded, well-organized, and deadly operations, particularly those associated with socialist state security services".

=== Odour capture ===
The odour capture was a technique to capture and trace individuals via their smell. This technique was used by the Stasi during the Cold War as an investigative tool to establish an opponent's identity. One of these odour jar artefacts is on display in the Berlin Spy Museum. The odour jars are often labelled with information such as GK (the abbreviation for Geruchskonserve meaning "odour sample"), the date and time the sample was taken and the name of the person it belongs. In 1979 the Stasi began to archive hundreds of "suspected political dissidents" smells through collecting their odours on materials such as clothing and storing them in air-tight jars. The Stasi eventually built an extensive scent archives in the belief that individual's odours could be preserved and that trained canine noses could detect them. Odours were captured in a number of ways by the Stasi, for example from the cars or houses of suspected individuals, or from crime scenes.

=== Enigma ===
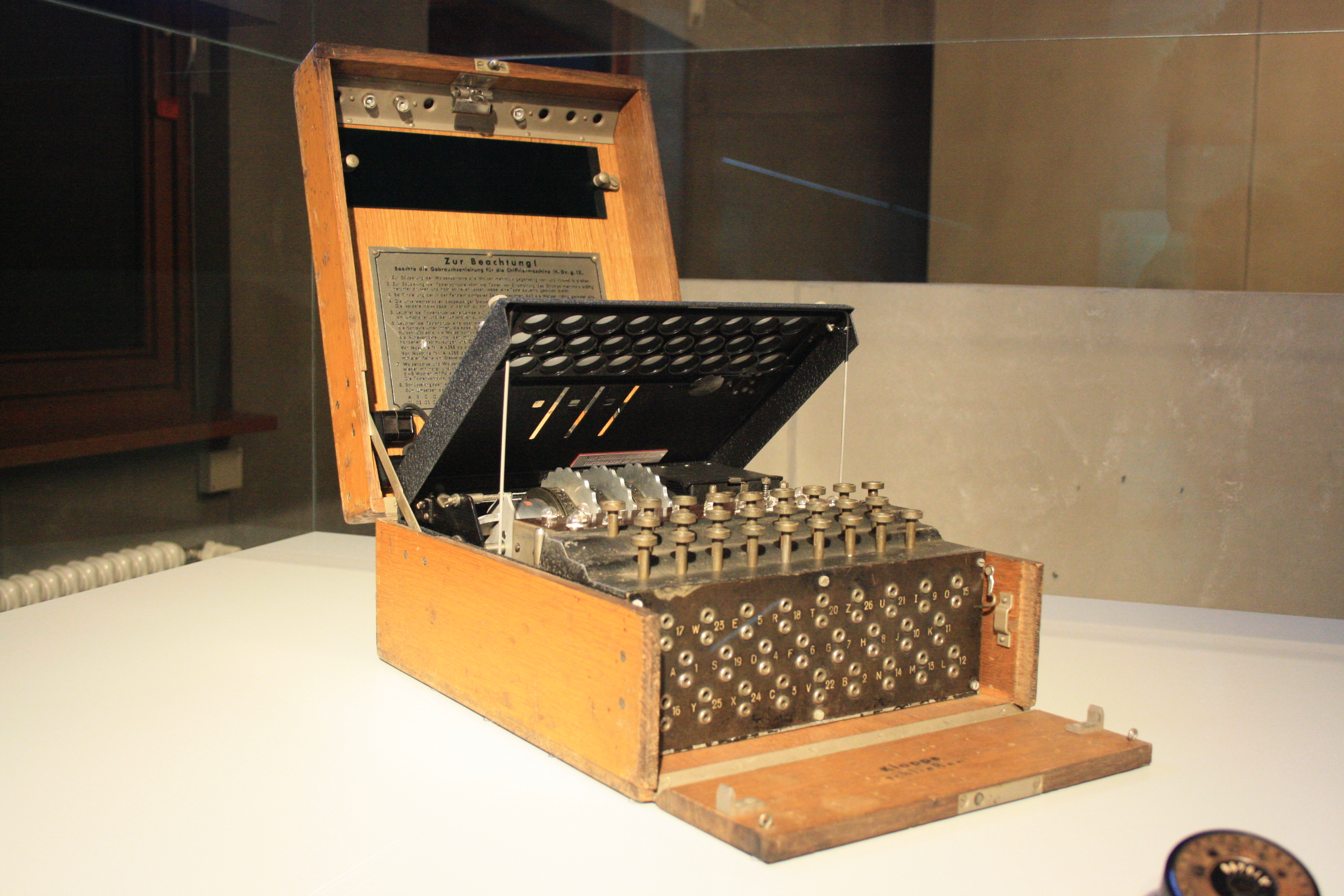
Enigma machine

The Enigma machine was the most famous encryption machine of World War II. The encoding device was invented in 1918 by the German, Dr. Arthur Scherbius. The Enigma machine resembled the construction of an old school typewriter, but had a series of rotors and wheels that could be changed to encode messages in 150 different ways. The German cipher machine was predominantly used throughout World War II to encrypt communications. Unknown to the Germans, the allies were able to decrypt and read the messages, but they continued to update and improve the Enigma machine in the belief that it would be more secure. One of the models of the Enigma machine, initially used by the German military, can be viewed in the museum.
