= Hermann Peter Piwitt =

German writer (1935–2026)

- Born: 28 January 1935; Wohldorf-Ohlstedt near Hamburg, Germany
- Died: 15 January 2026 (aged 90); Hamburg, Germany
- Education: Goethe University Frankfurt; LMU Munich; Free University of Berlin
- Occupation: Writer
- Employer(s): University of Warwick; University of Bremen; University of Wales in Swansea

Hermann Peter Piwitt (28 January 1935 – 15 January 2026) was a German writer.

== Life and career ==
Piwitt, the son of a civil servant, grew up in Frankfurt am Main. After graduating from high school, he studied sociology, philosophy, and literary studies at Goethe University Frankfurt, LMU Munich, and the Free University of Berlin. He was strongly influenced by the academic teachers Theodor W. Adorno and Walter Höllerer. In Frankfurt, Piwitt became friends with the photographer Abisag Tüllmann.

In 1967 and 1968, Piwitt worked as an editor at Rowohlt Publishing House, then in Reinbek near Hamburg. In 1968, he began contributing to the magazine konkret. From 1969 onward, he lived in Hamburg as a freelance writer, whose essays also appeared in journals such as Akzente and Sprache im technischen Zeitalter.

Piwitt, a member of the PEN Center Germany, received the Literature Advancement Award of the Berlin Art Prize in 1968 and a Villa Massimo Fellowship in 1971–72. In 1973, he became writer-in-residence at the University of Warwick in England, a position he held until 1974. In 1976, he received a teaching appointment at the University of Bremen. In 1999, he was writer-in-residence at the University of Wales in Swansea.

Piwitt distinguished himself with essays on political topics; his narrative works primarily illuminate the conditions in the Federal Republic of Germany and in Italy.

Piwitt died in Hamburg on 15 January 2026, at the age of 90.

== Works ==
Most of the original German titles are missing!

- "Herdenreiche Landschaften" (Landscapes Rich in Herds). Ten prose pieces. Rowohlt, Reinbek near Hamburg, 1965.
- "Das Bein des Bergmanns Wu" (The Miner Wu's Leg). Essays. Fischer Taschenbuch Verlag, Frankfurt am Main, 1971, ISBN 3-596-25968-1.
- "Frankfurt am Main in der Literatur#Hermann Peter Piwitt: Rothschilds|Rothschilds" (= Das neue Buch, Volume 16). Novel. Rowohlt, Reinbek near Hamburg, 1972.
- "Boccherini und andere Bürgerpflichten" (Boccherini and Other Civic Duties). Essays. Rowohlt, Reinbek near Hamburg 1976, ISBN 978-3-499-25071-2.
- The Gardens in March. Novel. Rowohlt, Reinbek near Hamburg 1979, ISBN 978-3-498-05235-5.
- Germany. An Attempt at Home. Novel. Hoffmann und Campe, Hamburg 1981, ISBN 978-3-455-05950-2.
- The Circumnavigation of Cape Horn by the Full-rigged Ship Susanne in 1909 in 52 Days. Essays. Konkret Literatur Verlag, Hamburg 1985, ISBN 3-922144-43-8.
- The Pomegranate. Novel. Hoffmann und Campe, Hamburg 1986, ISBN 3-455-05951-1.
- The Passion Fruit. Novel. Rowohlt, Reinbek near Hamburg 1993, ISBN 978-3-498-05260-7.
- An Irreconcilably Gentle End. A Novel. Rowohlt, Reinbek near Hamburg 1998, ISBN 978-3-498-05294-2.
- Stone Age: Notes from the Night 1989–2002. Diary Entries. Revonnah Verlag, Hanover 2003, ISBN 3-934818-18-8.
- Years Among Them. A Novel. Wallstein, Göttingen 2006, ISBN 3-8353-0082-2.
- Home, Beautiful Stranger. Stories and Sketches. Wallstein, Göttingen 2010, ISBN 978-3-8353-0621-9.
- Mercy. A Novella. Wallstein, Göttingen 2012, ISBN 978-3-8353-1043-8.
- "Signs of Life with 14 Holy Helpers: Stories from a Short Life." Autobiographical Retrospective. Wallstein, Göttingen 2014, ISBN 978-3-8353-1379-8.
- "Summer with a Raccoon." Novella. Wallstein, Göttingen 2015, ISBN 978-3-8353-1678-2.
- "Three Friends." Short Stories. Wallstein, Göttingen 2017, ISBN 978-3-8353-1979-0.

== Editorship ==
- With Peter Rühmkorf: "The Passing of Hearing and Sight: Aspects of Cultural Destruction." (= Literary Magazine, Volume 5). Rowohlt, Reinbek near Hamburg 1976, ISBN 978-3-499-25072-9.
- With Roman Ritter: *The Seventh Journey: Fourteen Utopian Tales*. Bertelsmann, Munich 1978, ISBN 3-570-05824-7.
- With Susann Henschel: *The Abundance of Water: Of Wells, Springs, and Beautiful Waters*. Poems. Philipp Reclam jun., Stuttgart 2006, ISBN 3-15-018450-9.

== Translations ==
- with Miodrag Vukic: Miodrag Bulatović: Der rote Hahn fliegt himmelwärts (The Red Rooster Flies Heavenwards). Munich 1960.
- with Miodrag Vukic: Miodrag Bulatović: Die Liebenden (The Lovers). Munich 1962.
- with Miodrag Vukic: Miodrag Bulatović: Der Schwarze (The Black One). Munich 1963.

== Journal articles ==
- Chronicle and Protocol (on Uwe Johnson: The Third Book About Achim.) In: Language in the Technological Age. No. 1, 1961, pp. 83–86.
- Atavism and Utopia of the 'Whole' Human Being. Remarks on the Western Novel. In: Language in the Technological Age. No. 3, 1962, pp. 199–206.
