= Schulprogramm (historical) =

Annual secondary school publication

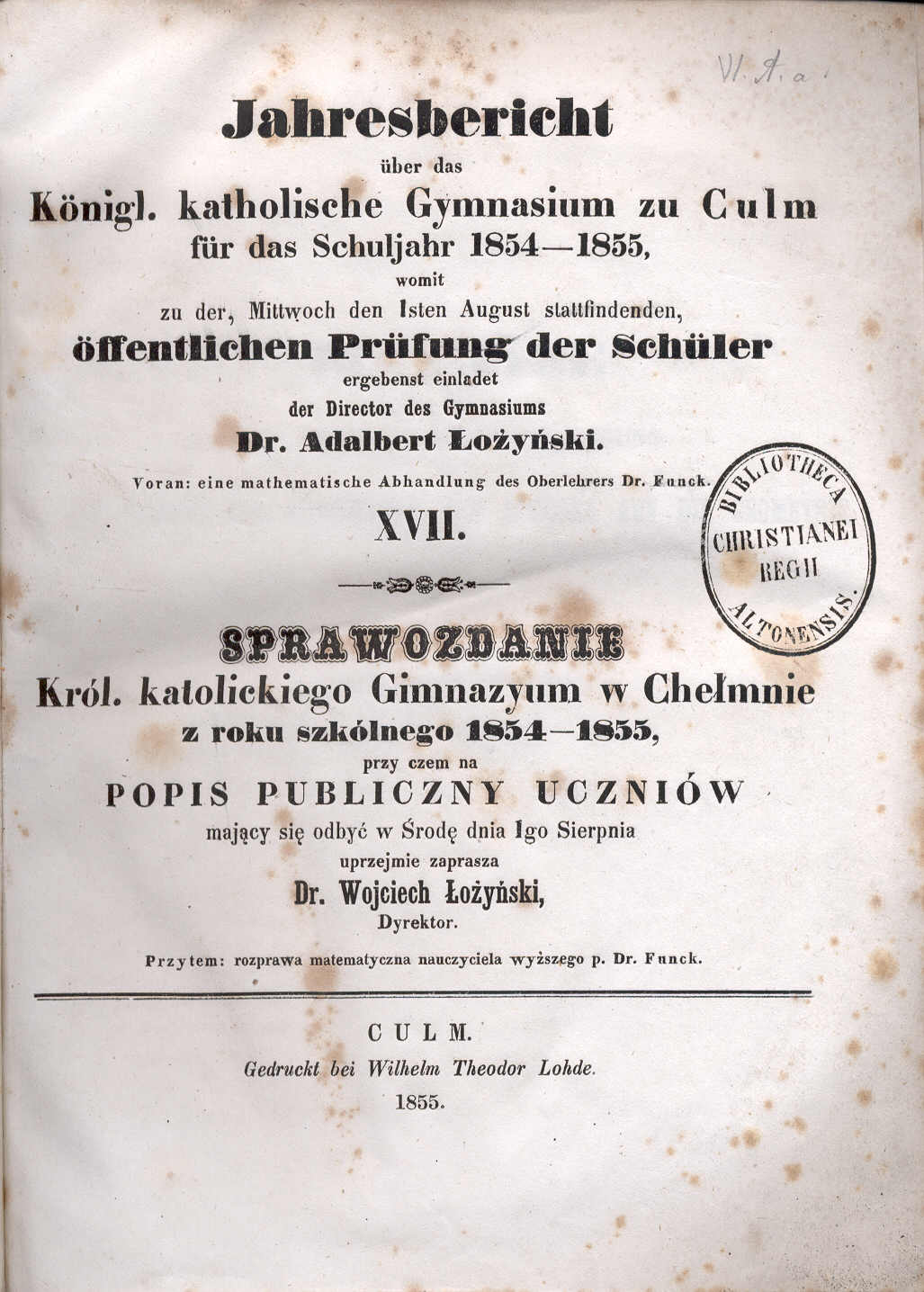
Title page of a Schulprogramm from Culm for the school year 1854/55, bilingual

In the 19th and early 20th centuries, a Schulprogramm was an annual printed publication by secondary schools. This publication typically combined the institution's annual report with a scientific treatise and was distributed among schools through the exchange. The Schulprogramm in Germany, Austria, and the former German-speaking regions of Eastern Europe and the Baltic States serves as a unique and invaluable resource for researching the development of the school system.

== Origin ==
The Schulprogramm originated from invitations sent by educational institutions for their annual examinations and lectures, which were forerunners of the Abitur. Printed invitations date back to the late 16th century and are derived from what were known as thesis sheet. By the 18th century, it became increasingly common for a "Gymnasium Academicum" to print invitations for individual special courses, as these events were often open to the public. The teaching program of the respective school year was listed in printed booklets in tabular form and provided with explanations. These event calendars were often enhanced by treatises written in Latin, in which the professors discussed the subjects of their teaching and showcased their scientific excellence. Occasionally, these publications were collected, bound in chronological order, and preserved as "Opuscula Professorum."

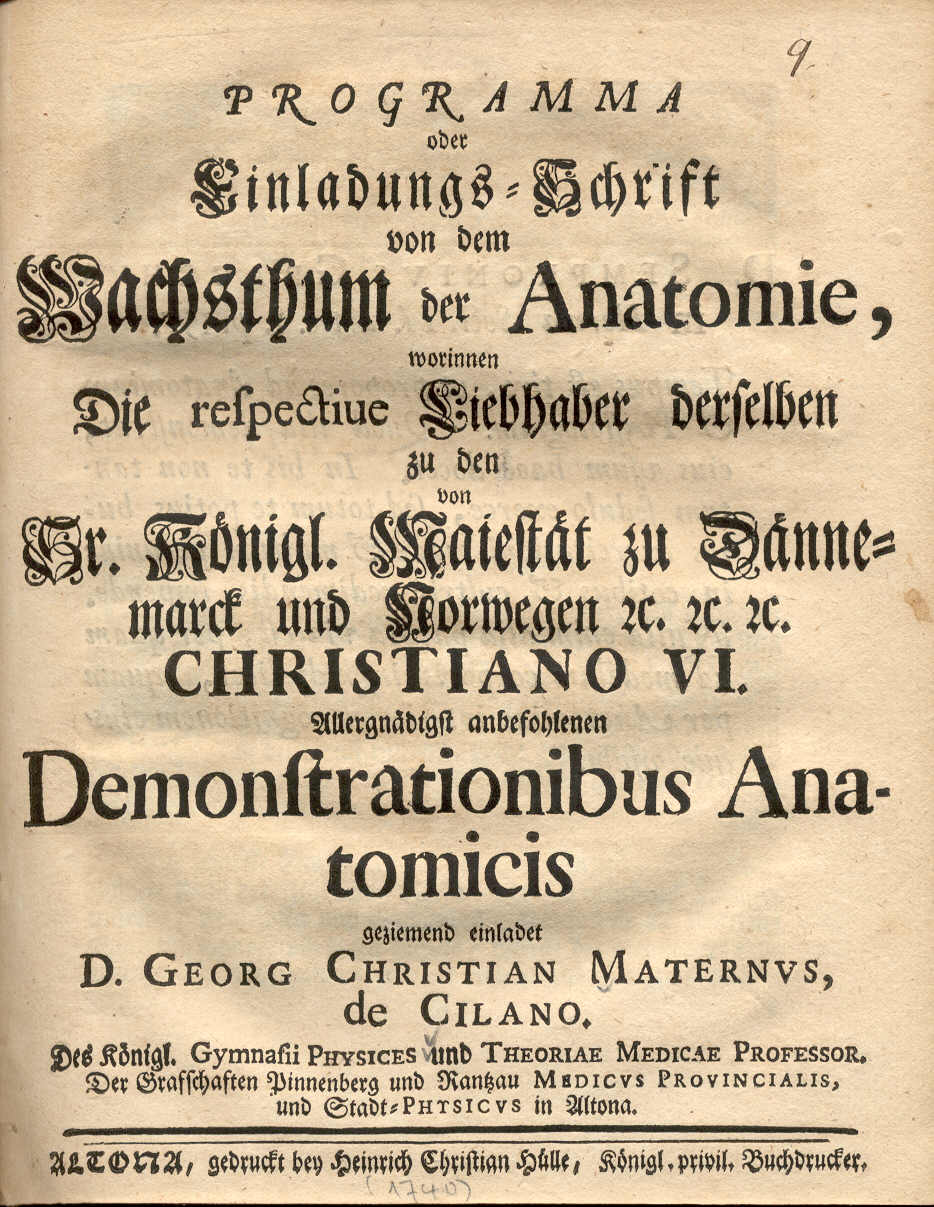
Invitation to a lecture by G. C. Matern de Cilano at the Royal Grammar School in Altona, 1740

In 1824, a decree of the Ministry of Education of 23 August concerning the grammar school examination programs made it obligatory for all Prussian grammar schools to give regular accounts of the work done, the content of the teaching, and the examinations in the form of programs that were to be published once a year. Shortly afterwards, other states followed this example, such as Bavaria (1825), Saxony (1833), Baden (1836), and a nationwide exchange was organized, which was joined by the Free Cities of Frankfurt am Main and Lübeck as early as 1831, Saxony and other states in 1836.

The programs facilitated the shared exchange of knowledge and experiences, as well as further training opportunities. They also served as a means of public relations. In addition, the Prussian school inspectorate was able to achieve a level of standardization through these programs.

Following the Prussian model, annual reports were also introduced in Austria in the 19th century. In contrast to Germany, this tradition was continued even after the end of the Second World War, and annual reports have consistently been published since then.

== Construction ==
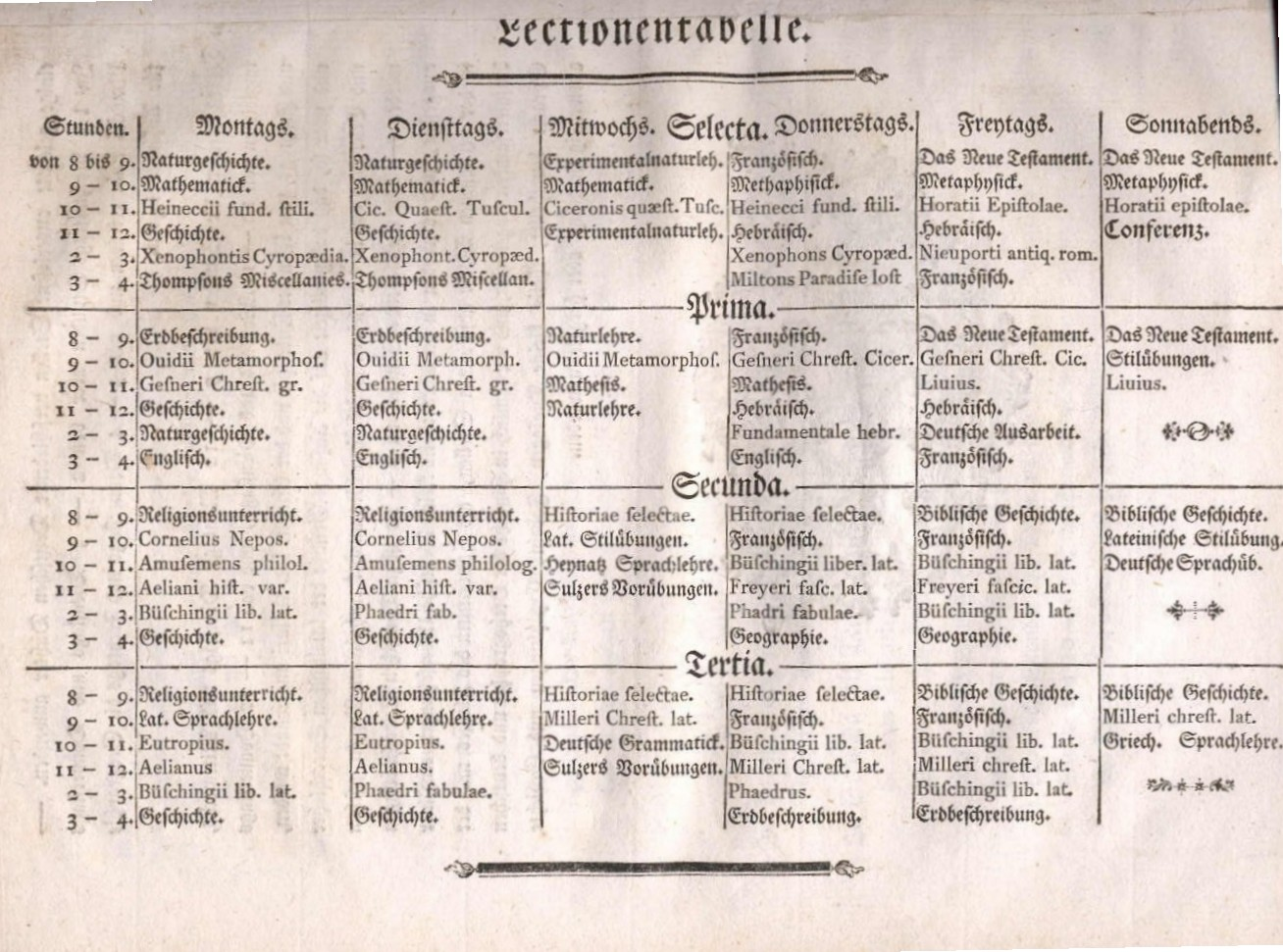
Table of lessons at the Royal Grammar School in Altona, 1777

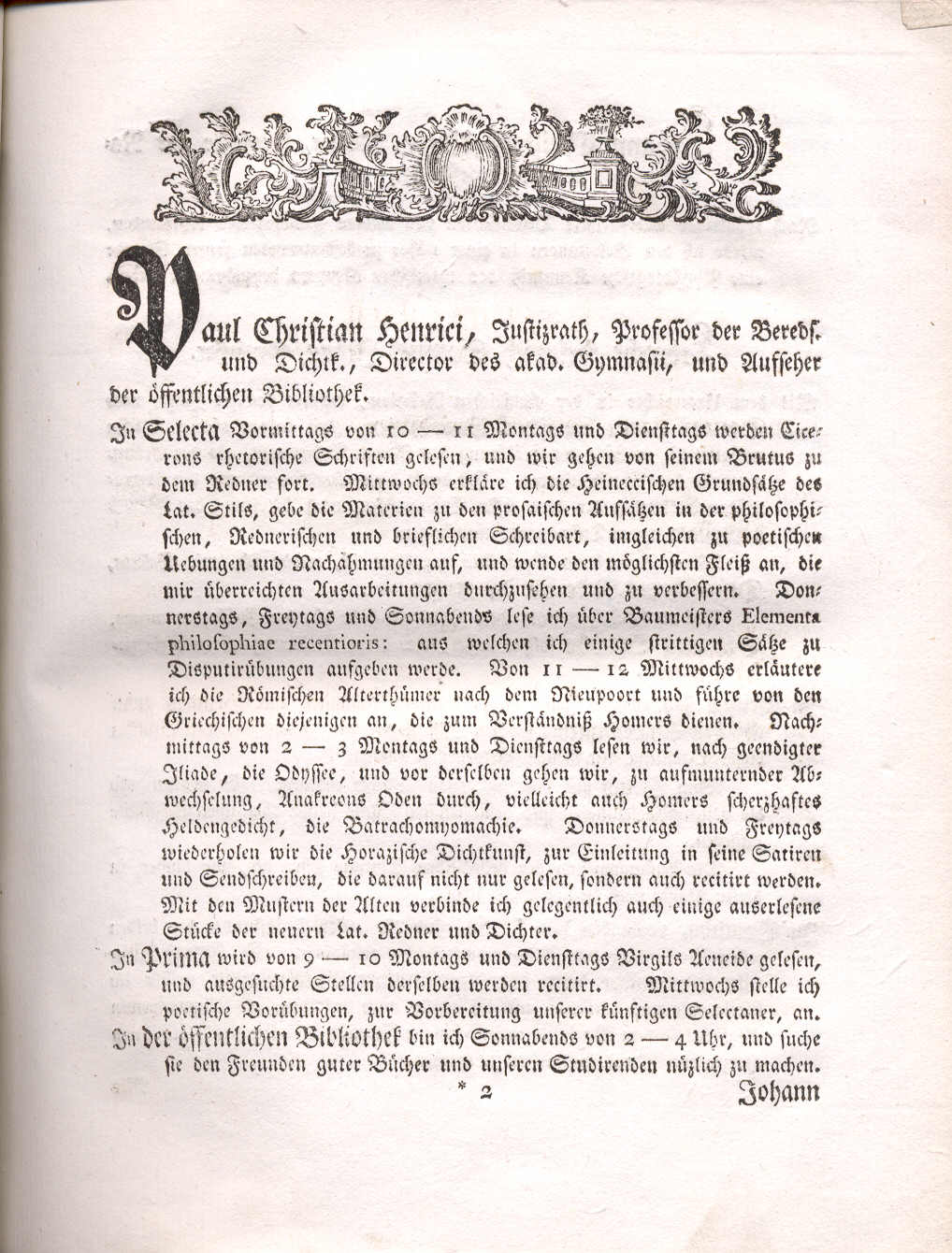
Announcement of the courses of a director and librarian, 1792

In the following decades, the Schulprogramm was given a uniform structure, which was specified for Prussia as follows:

- Treatise on a scientific topic by the director or a member of the teaching staff (compulsory until 1872, then optional as a supplement);
- School News:
  - Doctrinal Constitution;
  - Curriculum for the school year;
  - General curriculum;
  - Distribution of subjects among the individual teachers;
  - Special curriculum of the classes;
  - Overview of the orders of general interest issued;
  - Chronicle of the past school year;
  - Statistical News;
  - Curatorium and Teaching College of the Institution;
  - Frequency of the institution/names of the high school graduates;
  - Status of the teaching apparatus;
  - Budget of the institution;
  - Foundations of the school;
  - Special Notices to Parents;

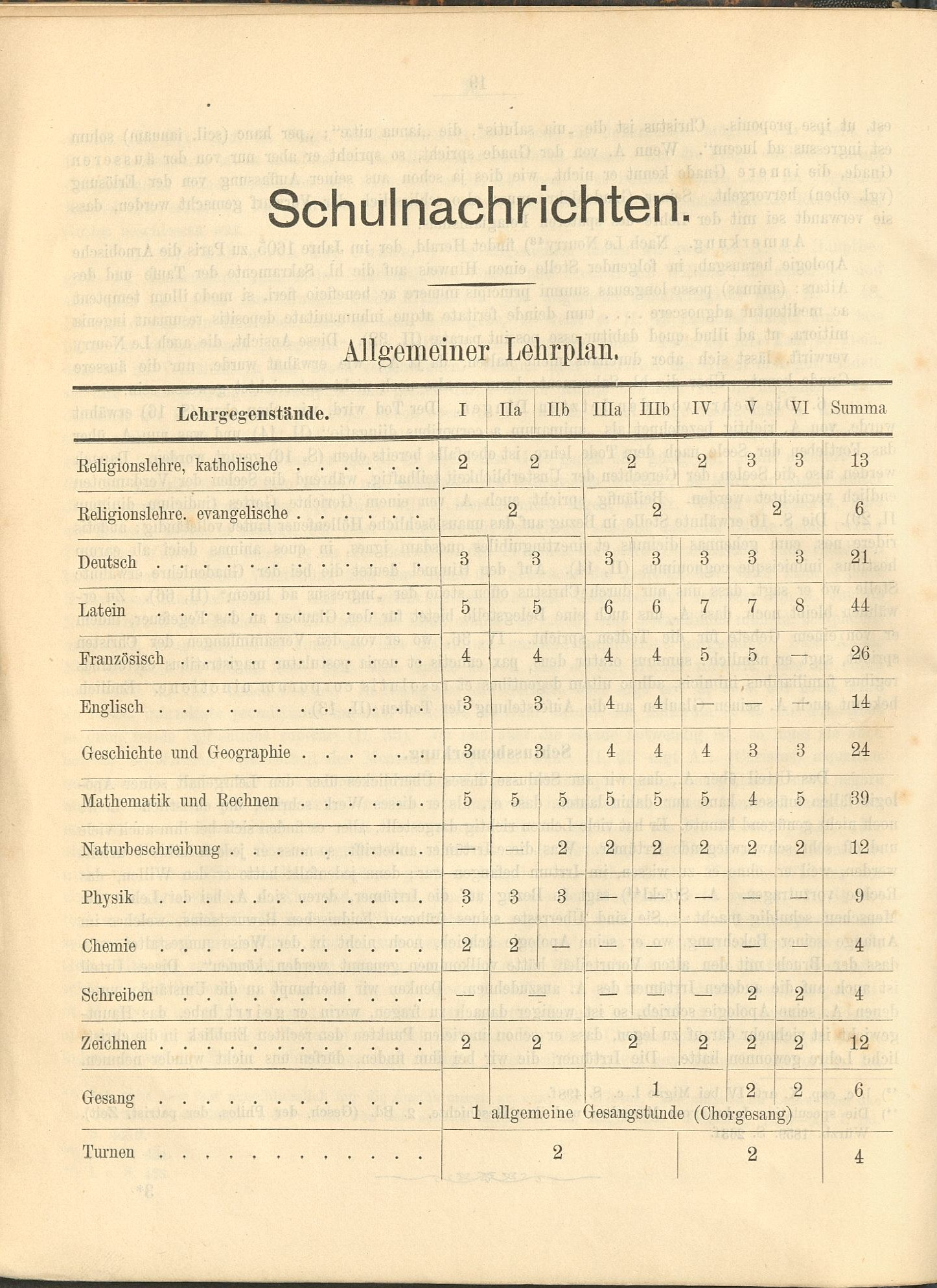
Timetable of the Realgymnasium Neisse 1883/84

In contrast to today's so-called Schulprogramm, the programs of the 19th century were based on different principles. Rather than outlining objectives and profiles for future school development, they provided reports on the previous school year. However, the distinct school profile was still clearly recognizable in these reports. The Schulprogramm is most comparable to the yearbooks of American schools and colleges.

Starting in 1899, the programs were officially renamed as annual reports. Although this name change took time to become widely accepted, the term Schulprogramm is still commonly used for these reports today. Additionally, the much older lecture advertisements have long been categorized in literature as Schulprogramm.

== Success and crisis ==
As early as 1860, 350 institutions participated in this exchange. In 1869, some schools already had more than 10,000 copies. In 1872, the requirement to include a treatise, which had been mandatory, was changed to an optional inclusion. However, by this time, the authorities were increasingly overwhelmed by the logistics of the exchange. Therefore, in 1876, the exchange was handed over to the Teubner publishing house in Leipzig, which could continue until 1916 with great logistical commitment. At this time, C. Struckmann estimates, that "a maximum of 50,000 programs were available at a Prussian school" with continuous collecting activity.

The original goal of creating a platform for further education and pedagogical exchange was lost amidst the overwhelming amount of material. In addition, there were problems with archiving and cataloguing. While in some schools this was done according to the school locations (provenance principle), in others this was done according to the topics of the treatises (pertinence principle), which destroyed the coherence of the tradition. Some schools refrained from cataloguing altogether, which made all the material inaccessible. In many cases, this old stock was increasingly perceived as a burden. A decree issued in 1943 declared the Schulprogramm to be undoubtedly mostly dispensable and ordered them to be transferred to the scrap collection.

In the 1960s, it was common for anything that survived this segregation to end up in the trash or the antiquarian bookstore. The collection of Schulprogramm publications at the Justus Liebig University in Giessen was created by purchasing 12,000 copies from the antiquarian bookshop trade in 1969 at a unit price of 0.66 DM. This stock was considerably increased by donations from schools, which raised a further 35,000 copies in the course of 1970, and the purchase of 34,000 Schulprogramm, purchased from Vienna from 1974 to 1978 at a price of DM 0.40 each.

== Meaning ==
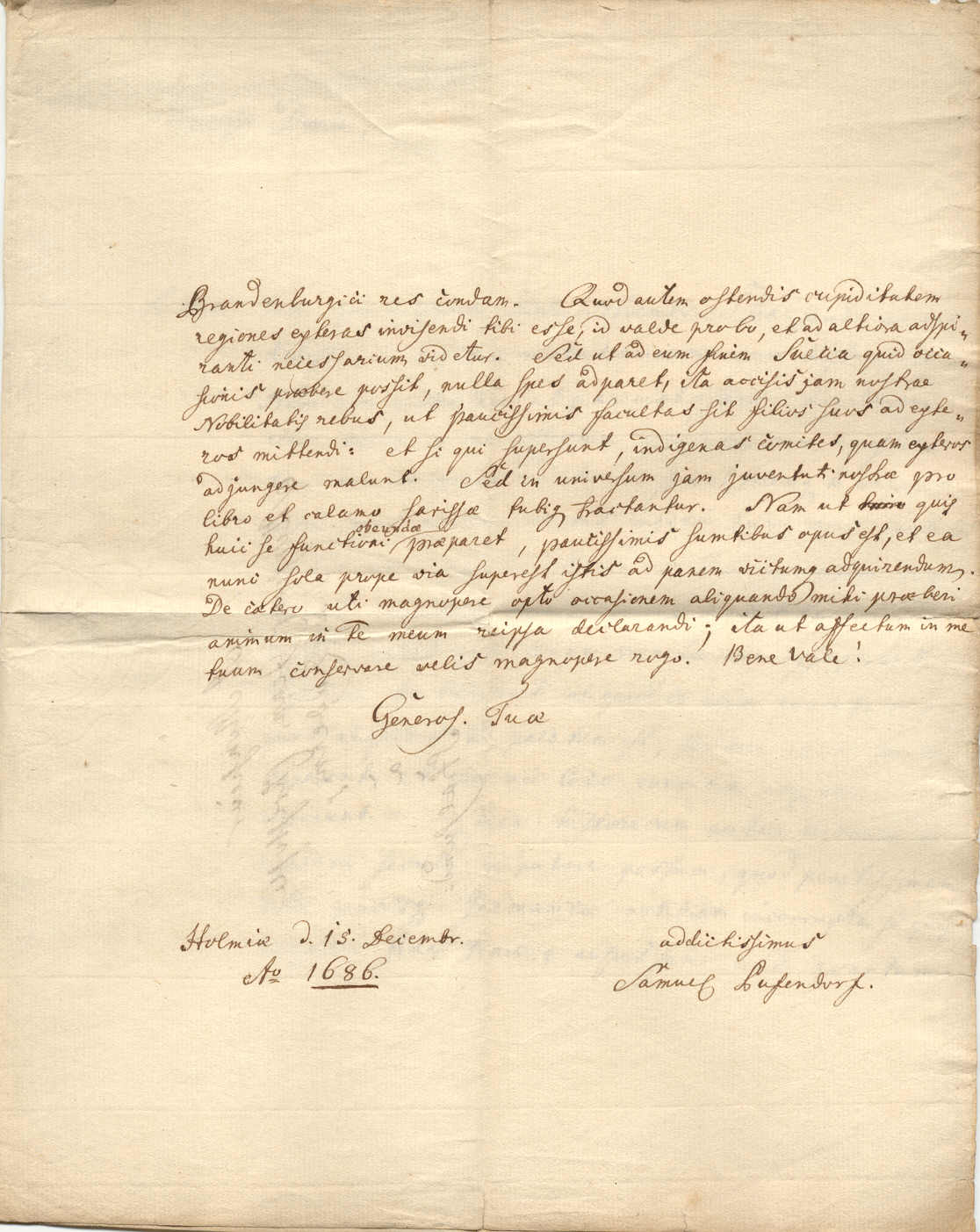
From a letter from Samuel von Pufendorf from Stockholm to a Jean Christofle in Stralsund, 15 December 1686; edited by Johann Claussen in a Schulprogramm 1906.

Due to occasional issues with bibliographic accessibility, the value of the Schulprogramm as a source has developed gradually. In the foreword to the catalogue of the collection in the Lübeck City Library, it is stated that Schulprogramm is one of the most distinguished source genres for research in the fields of school history, history of education, historical sociology of education, school folklore, and the history of ideology.

The treatises provide a insight into the wide-ranging scientific interests of the teaching staff. They represent the high standards maintained by grammar schools in particular. Additionally, especially before the advent of specialized journals, these treatises served as a platform for local history and educational discussions. They also reflected contemporary trends in the scientific community, such as the introduction of modern foreign languages like French and English or the rapid rise of the natural sciences in the second half of the 19th century.

In the meantime, some Schulprogramm treatises have even gained special scholarly importance, for example when they contain editions of remote, including literary texts, which have not been replaced in the meantime. In 1898, for instance, Alfred Puls edited a Low German prayer book from the 14th century as part of the scientific supplement, and in 1904 and 1906, Johann Claussen published the letters of the philologist Johannes Caselius, written in 1589, in Schulprogramm. Christian Heinrich Postels and Jacob von Melle's description of a journey after the Netherlands and England in 1683 was first edited in 1891 in a Lübeck Schulprogramm.

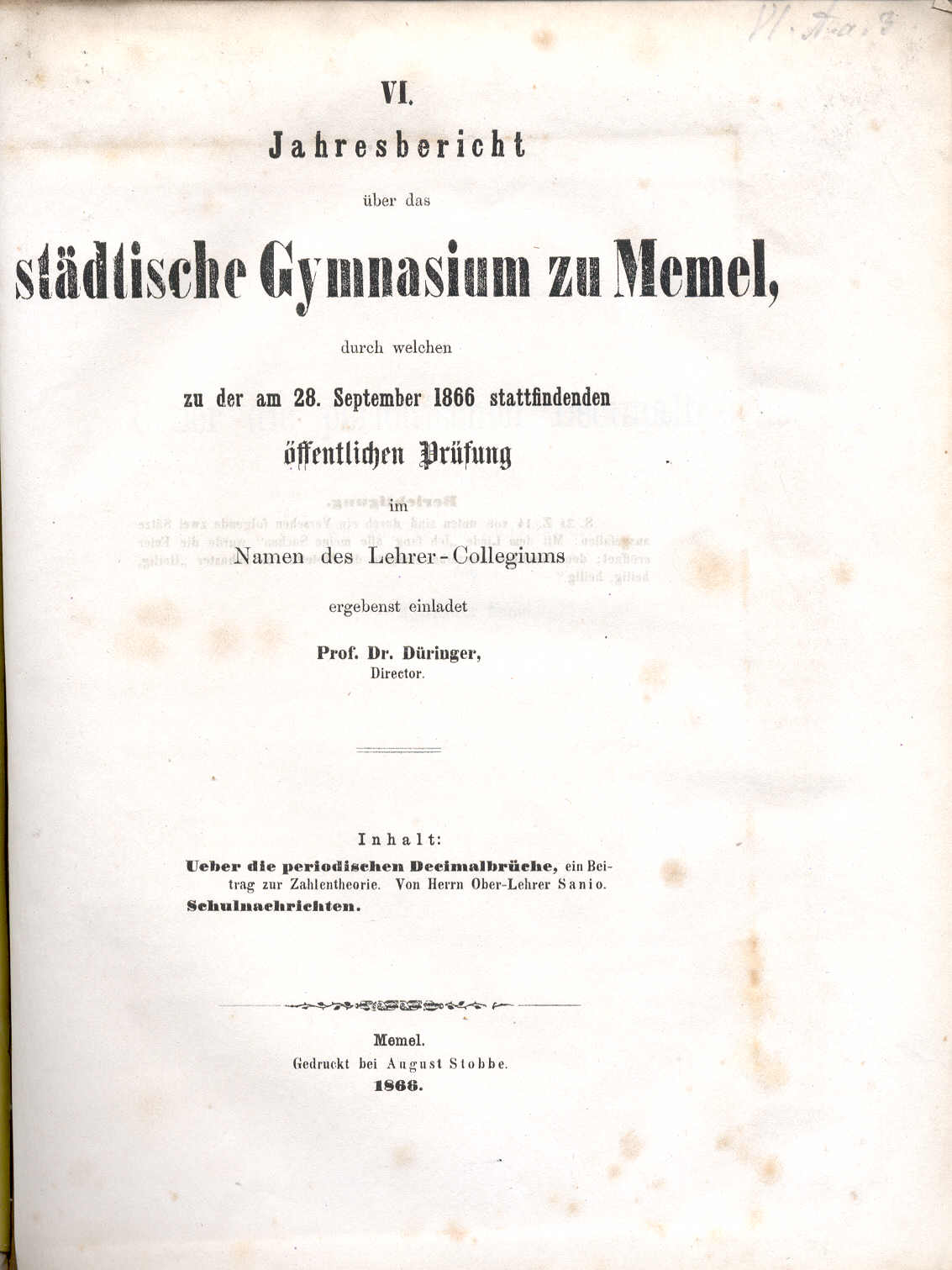
Schulprogramm of the Gymnasium zu Memel, 1866; title page

The actual annual reports are a treasure trove of data and facts that would otherwise be difficult to collect. For some schools, for example, those of the German eastern territories, they represent their only tradition after the destruction of the war, especially through the chronological parts required by the Prussian instructors in the Schulprogramm. The lists of pupils and teachers are often important sources from which, for example, the joint school attendance of well-known persons or teacher-pupil relationships can be reconstructed.

In some cases, however, which mainly concern West German institutions, the chronicles of the schools and the reports on what had been achieved could be continued in other publications after the end of the accountability, some schools still publish official yearbooks that provide information on special student activities, projects, new subjects, and retired and newly hired teachers. However, the content is quite different and often depends on the interest and special commitment of individual teachers. In addition, there are sometimes semi-official publications, e.g. publications by alumni, friends, or support associations of the grammar schools.

== Tradition ==
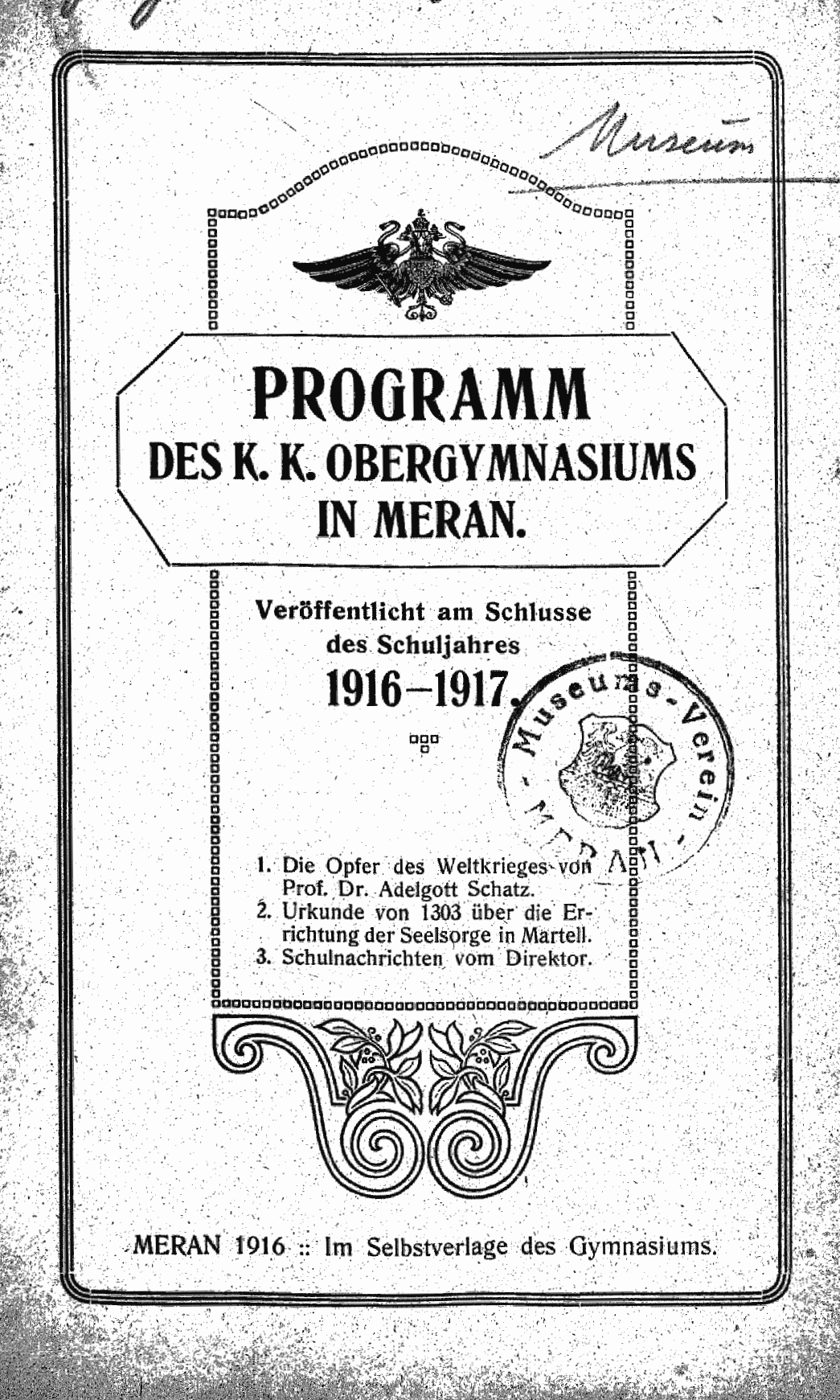
Schulprogramm of the Imperial and Royal High School Merano from 1916–1917, title page

In addition to the already mentioned collections in Giessen and Lübeck, extensive holdings of Schulprogramm can be found above all in the central Prussian collection of the former Reich Office for Schools in Berlin, since 1997 in the Library for Research in the History of Education, as well as in the library of the Francke Foundations in Halle (Saale) and (collected from 1836 to 1918) in the Hamburg Christianeum.

The Düsseldorf University and State Library has a collection of around 40,000 Schulprogramm, which it has indexed, digitized, and made available on the Internet since 2009 – including in the journal database (ZDB). In 2014, the ULB Düsseldorf began to catalogue and digitize the Schulprogramm collection of the Görres Gymnasium Düsseldorf in the same way as its holdings. The aim is to create a digital collection in which almost the entire stock of Schulprogramm in Germany will be made accessible in a more in depth form.

In the USA, the library of the University of Pennsylvania has a larger holding, based on 16,555 German and Austrian programs from the period 1850 to 1918, which came from the state grammar school in Graz and were acquired in 1954 through a Swiss antiquarian bookshop. In 1961, a printed catalogue was published, which is arranged alphabetically by the author. The humanities titles, which comprise about one third of the collection and were considered to be more important in terms of content than the natural science titles, are also accessible via an English language keyword index.

== Bibliographies ==
The first bibliographies of Schulprogramm's writings were published within the Schulprogramm itself. Notable compilations include those by Wilhelm Vetter (Ordered Directory of Treatises, which appeared in the school writings of all educational institutions participating in the program exchange from 1851 to 1863. 2 parts, program of the Gymnasium Luckau, 1864 and 1865) and Joseph Terbeck (Ordered Directory of the Treatises, which appeared in the school writings of all the educational institutions participating in the program exchange from 1864 to 1868. Program of the Gymnasium Dionysianum, Rheine 1868). A continuation is the Systematic Ordered Directory of those treatises, speeches, and poems published by Franz Hübl in Vienna in 1874, which are contained in the secondary Schulprogramm of Austria since 1870–1873 and in those of Prussia and Bavaria since 1869–1872.

Between 1876 and 1910, Rudolf Klussmann compiled the Systematic Directory of Treatises, which was published in five volumes by the Teubner publishing house. This work encompasses the school publications of all educational institutions involved in the program exchange. The programs were indexed in 13 thematically subdivided main groups as well as through an index of places and authors. Between 1890 and 1931, the annual index of treatises published at German schools was published by the Royal Library (later the State Library), arranged according to the author's alphabet with subject and place indexes.

The most extensive bibliography, with about 55,000 titles listed, is the Index of program treatises of German, Austrian and Swiss schools of the years 1825–1918 compiled by Franz Kössler based on the Giessen holdings (4 volumes 1987 and supplementary volume 1991). It is arranged alphabetically by author and contains a directory of places and schools. Schulprogramm has been discussed in the educational press in the past. For example, the Zeitschrift für das Gymnasialwesen 1847–1912 (list of digitized copies) contains countless reviews of Prussian Schulprogramm.

== Bibliography ==
- Ächtler, Norman (2020). Schulprogramme Höherer Lehranstalten. Interdisziplinäre Perspektiven auf eine wiederentdeckte bildungs- und kulturwissenschaftliche Quellengattung [School programmes of secondary schools. Interdisciplinary perspectives on a rediscovered educational and cultural studies source genre] (in German). Hannover: Wehrhahn Verlag. ISBN 978-3-86525-820-5.
- Haubfleisch, Dietmar; Ritzi, Christian (2011). "Bibliothek und Forschung. Die Bedeutung von Sammlungen für die Wissenschaft". In Siebert, Irmgard (ed.). Schulprogramme – zu ihrer Geschichte und ihrer Bedeutung für die Historiographie des Erziehungs- und Bildungswesens [School programmes - on their history and their significance for the historiography of the education system]. Zeitschrift für Bibliothekswesen und Bibliographie. Sonderband 102 (in German). Frankfurt am Main: Klostermann. pp. 165–205, 251–252. ISBN 978-3-465-03685-2.
- Staatlichen Auskunftstelle für Schulwesen (ed.). Jahresberichte der höheren Lehranstalten in Preußen [Annual reports of the secondary schools in Prussia.] (in German). Leipzig.
- Klussmann, Rudolf (1976) [1876–1910]. Systematisches Verzeichnis der Abhandlungen von Schulschriften [Systematic index of treatises of school publications] (in German). Vol. 5 volumes. Hildesheim / New York: Georg Olms Verlag.
- Kirschbaum, Markus (2007). Litteratura Gymnasii, Schulprogramme höherer Lehranstalten des 19. Jahrhunderts als Ausweis von Wissenschaftsstandort, Berufsstatus und gesellschaftspolitischer Prävention [Litteratura Gymnasii, school programmes of higher educational institutions of the 19th century as evidence of academic location, professional status and socio-political prevention]. Schriften des Landesbibliothekszentrums Rheinland-Pfalz (in German). Vol. 2. Koblenz: Landesbibliothekszentrum Rheinland-Pfalz. ISSN 1861-6224.
- Kochendörfer, Siegrid; Smolinski, Elisabeth; Schweitzer, Robert (2000). Katalog der Schulprogrammsammlung der Stadtbibliothek Lübeck [Catalogue of the school programme collection of the Lübeck City Library]. Veröffentlichungen der Stadtbibliothek Lübeck. Reihe 3, 12. Verzeichnisse (in German). Lübeck: Bibliothek der Hansestadt. ISBN 3-933652-10-3.
- Koppitz, Hans-Joachim (1988). "Zur Bedeutung der Schulprogramme für die Wissenschaft heute" [The importance of school programmes for science today]. Gutenberg-Jahrbuch (in German). 68: 340–358. ISSN 0072-9094.
- Kössler, Franz (2008). Personenlexikon von Lehrern des 19. Jahrhunderts: Berufsbiographien aus Schul-Jahresberichten und Schulprogrammen 1825–1918 mit Veröffentlichungsverzeichnissen [Dictionary of 19th century teachers: professional biographies from school annual reports and school programmes 1825-1918 with lists of publications] (Preprint) (in German). Gießen: Gießen.
- Kuchenbuch, Freidank (1938). "600 Jahre Gymnasium zu Stendal 1338–1938. Festschrift". In Winckelmann-Schule (ed.). Über alte Stendaler Schulprogramme [About old Stendal school programmes] (in German). Stendal: Winckelmann-Schule. pp. 149ff.
- Markewitz, Friedrich (2019). Das Schulprogramm als Textsorte zwischen Erziehungs- und Wissenschaftssystem. Eine systemtheoretisch-textsortenlinguistische Untersuchung [The school programme as a text type between the educational and academic systems. A system-theoretical-text variety linguistic investigation]. Projekt Angewandte Linguistik (PAL) (in German). Vol. 2. Berlin: Berlin. ISBN 978-3-643-14043-2.
- Noeske, Felicitas (2006). "Die Schulprogramme" [The school programmes]. Christianeum. Mitteilungsblatt des Vereins der Freunde des Christianeums in Verbindung mit der Vereinigung Ehemaliger Christianeer (in German). 61 (2): 107ff. Archived from the original on 20 September 2020.
- Siebert, Irmgard (2013). "ULB Düsseldorf digitalisiert Schulprogramm-Sammlung der Bibliothek des Görres-Gymnasiums" [ULB Düsseldorf digitises school programme collection of the Görres-Gymnasium library]. B.I.T. Online (in German). 16 (6): 478–479.
- Siebert, Irmgard (2014). "'hidden collections' auf dem Hochleistungsrechner. ULB Düsseldorf digitalisiert Schulprogramm-Sammlung der Bibliothek des Görres-Gymnasiums" [‘Hidden collections’ on the high-performance computer. ULB Düsseldorf digitises school programme collection of the Görres-Gymnasium library]. Bub: Forum Bibliothek und Information (in German). 66 (1): 9.
- Ullrich, Richard (1908). Programmwesen und Programmbibliothek der Höheren Schulen in Deutschland, Österreich und der Schweiz. Übersicht der Entwicklung im 19. Jahrhundert und Versuch einer Darstellung der Aufgaben für die Zukunft [Programme system and programme library of secondary schools in Germany, Austria and Switzerland. Overview of developments in the 19th century and an attempt to outline the tasks for the future] (in German). Berlin: Weidmann. OCLC 1014838187.
- Wieckhorst, Katrin (2013). Schulschriften und ihre Erschließung in Bibliotheken [School publications and their cataloguing in libraries] (in German). Halle (Saale): Universitäts- und Landesbibliothek Sachsen-Anhalt. ISBN 978-3-86829-568-9.
