= Prussian Heritage Image Archive =

Coordinates: 52°30′46.38″N 13°24′36.68″E

- Bildarchiv Preußischer Kulturbesitz (bpk)
- Location: Otto-Nagel Haus; Märkisches Ufer 16-18; 10179 Berlin-Mitte, Germany
- Established: 1966
- Dissolved: 30 June 2026
- Branch of: Berlin State Library

Collection
- Items collected: photographs, drawings, advertisements, cartoons
- Size: 13.5 million images
- Legal deposit: No

Access and use
- Access requirements: Commercial and Academic researchers, by appointment only
- Circulation: No public circulation

Other information
- Director: Hanns-Peter Frentz
- Website: bpk-bildagentur.de

The Prussian Heritage Image Archive (German: Bildarchiv Preußischer Kulturbesitz or 'bpk') was an agency of the Prussian Cultural Heritage Foundation, dissolved on 30 June 2026. The archive is housed at the Otto Nagel-Haus in Berlin and offers photographs, cartoons and drawings in the fields of history, culture and fine arts. The collection also contains the personal estates, archives and portfolios of many famous photographers who documented life in Germany. Organizationally, the archive is a division of the Berlin State Library.

== History ==
The core of the collection was built in 1966 from the historical picture library of Hermann Handke. This stock consists of about 1 million daguerrotypes, talbotypes, photographic prints, negatives, engravings and lithographs. Through targeted acquisitions, donations and estate gifts, bpk's collection has grown to over 12 million photographs today and is one of the largest in Europe.

== The Collection ==
Photographs documenting contemporary German history form the vast majority of the collection. Photographs of works of fine arts and culture from famous museums around the world are the second main focus.

=== German Historical Photography ===
The earliest part of the collection starts with photographs from the period of the German Empire (1871–1918). During the Weimar Republic (1919–1933), press photography is particularly well represented. The period of the Third Reich and World War II (1933–1945) is widely documented by many photographers, some of whom also went on to document early postwar Germany (1945–49). Current events in the later years of West Germany is extensively well represented, as well as photographs of everyday life in the communist-ruled German Democratic Republic.

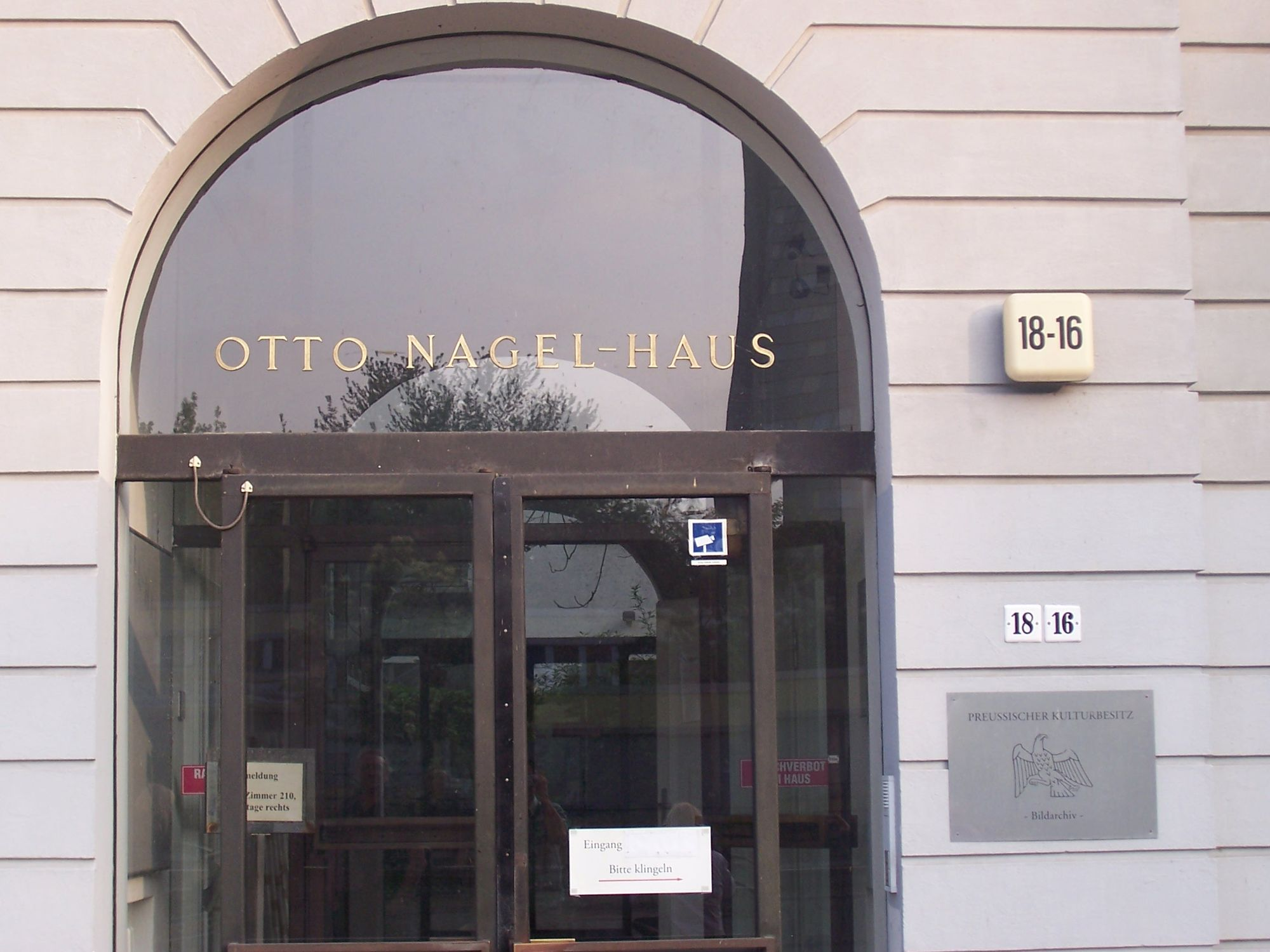

=== Culture and Fine Arts Photography ===
The core of this collection consists of photographs of fine arts and artifacts in the Berlin State Museums, the Berlin State Library and the other institutions of the Prussian Cultural Heritage Foundation. The collection has been expanded with digital photographs of artworks from museums outside Berlin, including the Bavarian State Picture Collection, the Hamburger Kunsthalle, the Staatliche Kunstsammlungen Dresden, and the Museum der bildenden Künste in Leipzig. bpk is also the sole distributor in the German language market for photographs of fine arts from the Réunion des Musées Nationaux in Paris, including the Louvre, Musée d'Orsay and Musée National d'Art Moderne. Since 2005 bpk has become the sole distributor in Germany, Austria and Switzerland for the Italian picture agency Scala Archives, which contributes photographs of artworks in famous Italian museums.

=== Online Collection ===
Through its web portal, bpk makes available over 300,000 digital images from its collection. With few exceptions the agency holds exclusive copyright to its collection. Therefore, the images are not in the public domain and publication rights must be obtained from bpk.

=== End of business operations ===
The bpk ceased operations on 30 June 2026; its own photo archive was integrated into the Berlin State Library.

== Known artists represented ==
- Arthur Grimm: World War II
- Bernd Heyden: Everyday life, 1970s and 1980s
- Hanns Hubmann: Current affairs, 1930s to 1980s
- Bernd Lohse: Travel, 1930s to 1950s
- Willi Moegle: Design and advertising, 1920s to 1990s
- Hildegard Ochse: Contemporary history, 1970s to 1990s
- Hilmar Pabel: Contemporary history, 1930s to 1970s
- Erich Salomon: Contemporary history, 1920/1930s
- Friedrich Seidenstücker: Daily life and current affairs in Berlin, 1920s to 1950s
- Abisag Tüllmann: Everyday life, culture and politics of the Federal Republic of Germany, 1950s to 1980s
- Charles Paul Wilp: Advertising, 1950s to 1970s
- Benno Wundshammer: Current affairs, 1930s to 1970s

== See also ==
- List of libraries in Germany
