= Hildegard Ochse =

German photographer

- Born: December 7, 1935; Bad Salzuflen, Lippe, Germany
- Died: June 28, 1997; Berlin, Germany
- Occupation: Photographer
- Style: Documentary
- Website: hildegard-ochse.de, autorenfotografin.de

Hildegard Ochse (December 7, 1935 – June 28, 1997) was a German photographer.

== Life and work ==
Hildegard Maria Helene Ochse (maiden name Römer) was born at home in Bad Salzuflen, Westphalia on December 7, 1935, the daughter of Dr. phil. Emma Maria Römer-Krusemeyer (1894–1964) and Arthur Peter Maria Römer (1893–1957). At age sixteen in the summer of 1952, Hildegard left in the summer the provincial Bad Salzuflen. She traveled as an exchange student on scholarship to Rochester. Once in Rochester, she lived with a host family and attended the Catholic Nazareth Academy. Her host father was employed by Eastman Kodak as a senior chemist in the development department and his knowledge of photography became an important influence for Hildegard. In the US, she produced her first portraits as well as remarkable street and architectural photographs. After a year in 1953, Hildegard returned to Bad Salzuflen with her high school diploma. In 1955 she passed her German high exams with honors and began studying romance languages and art history at the University of Freiburg in Breisgau with Dr. Hugo Friedrich (1904–1978) and Dr. Kurt Bauch (1897–1975), whose areas of research were among others Dutch painting and Rembrandt. During her studies, she met her future husband Horst Ochse (1927–2014) at the university in Freiburg. In 1957 she received a scholarship to Aix-en-Provence in southern France and lived with a photographer in modest conditions. She was impressed by the landscape and the colors in Provence and wrote »... if I were a painter, I think I could not paint this country because it is too BEAUTIFUL. And the eye cannot take in these colors and these forms at once. If painting a landscape, then northern Germany, the marshes, the fields...«. In the same year, she became pregnant in the fall, and her father unexpectedly died on her birthday. In March her marriage to the later Dr. phil. Horst Ochse followed. In summer, she gave birth to her first child and had to quit studying. In the following seven years, Hildegard had three other children who required her full attention. In the spring of 1973, the family moved to West Berlin for professional reasons. After an extended stay in France with the family in 1975, their marriage began to fail later leading to a final separation. Almost simultaneously in early 1975, Hildegard again discovered her passion for photography. At first she taught herself. Subsequently, she learned through the Werkstatt für Photographie (Workshop for Photography), in photography courses of the continuing education center in Zehlendorf in 1976, and later in the legendary photography workshop of Michael Schmidt (1945–2014) in Berlin-Kreuzberg.

At the beginning of the workshop, a somewhat orthodox documentary way of seeing dominated, which organized itself around the aesthetics of Michael Schmidt and focused on a presentation of everyday life. Later, the photography scene experimented with new forms of documentation which emphasized a subjective view of the author. Hildegard Ochse quickly developed an independent, artistic authorship with a personal viewpoint. Most students and attendees were self-taught and therefore had a more liberal understanding of the medium compared to professional photographers. The imagery and the content were initially more important than technical quality. She participated in courses under the direction of Ulrich Görlich (1952–), Wilmar Koenig (1952–2018), as well as workshops by American photographers such as Lewis Baltz (1945–2014), John Gossage (1946–), Ralph Gibson (1939–) and Larry Fink (1952–) and the German photographer André Gelpke (1947–). Her imagery developed soon after initial attempts—profound, multi-layered and philosophical, dense, highly concentrated, conceptual and documentary. She created images primarily for herself and per her own wishes.

From 1978 Hildegard taught photography at the state media center, as well as at the Pedagogical University Berlin and could present her images in galleries for the first time. Shortly after her new beginning, the first photo series were purchased by the Berlin Gallery. After the final separation from her husband and a private fresh start, she established herself as an independent author photographer as of 1981. She received extensive commissions, grants and exhibitions at home and abroad. A portion of the body of work she produced is housed in the collections of the Berlinische Galerie in Berlin, Art Collection of the German Bundestag, and at the Universitá di Parma, Centro studi, dip. Fotografia and private collections. She traveled extensively with her camera and thus unintentionally documented her own life. Italy became her preferred destination. In 1995 she was diagnosed with leukemia, she died in the summer of 1997 at the age of 61 in Berlin. She and her husband had four children: Adrian, Katharina, Caroline, Benjamin.

Publishing rights for most of Hildegard Ochse's photographs are now handled by her son Benjamin Ochse and the Prussian Heritage Image Archive.

== Notable works ==
- 1979: Natur in der Stadt, Großstadtvegetation
- 1980: No Future – Café M_
- 1980: Landscapes – (Denmark at the beach)
- 1981: Municipal church
- 1980–83: Aspeti di Berlino (Street photography, Winter in Berlin)
- 1982: Bosa
- 1983: Topographic Sequenzen of a city and changing landscapes
- 1983: Host country Germany
- 1983: Bomarzo
- 1985: The anthropology and the portrait
- 1986–87: The oath of the constitution
- 1987: KPM – Königliche Porzellan-Manufaktur Berlin
- 1989: Israel : Land der Steine (Land of Stones)
- 1989–90: Metamorphose (The Berlin Wall)
- 1990: Peregrination though Mark-Brandenburg
- 1990: Kinder (Kids)
- 1991: Normandy

== Exhibitions ==
- 1978: Gallery Franz Mehring, Berlin, Germany.
- 1979: Gallery Mutter Fourage, Berlin, Germany.
- 1983: Gallery Fioretta, Rispecchio (Reflextions), group exhibition, Padua, Italy.
- 1983: Gallery II Diaframma-Canon, Gastland Bundesrepublik Deutschland (English Host Country Federal Republic of Germany) group exhibition, Milan, Italy.
- 1984: Berlin University of the Arts, Bilder einer Ausstellung (English Photos of an exhibition), solo exhibition, Berlin, Germany.
- 1985: Gallery fotografica comunale, Centro Culturale Pubblico Polivalente, Aspetti di Berlino, group exhibition, Ronchi dei Legionari near Trieste, Italy.
- 1987: Martin-Gropius-Bau, Berlin - Stadtfotografie / Topographische Sequenzen der Stadt und ihre wechselnden Landschaften (English Berlin - Street Photography / Topographic Sequenzen of a City and Changing Landscapes), Berlin Festival Gallery, 750 Years Berlin, group exhibition, Berlin, Germany.
- 1991: Gallery "Inselstraße *13", Metamorphose, group exhibition, Berlin, Germany.
- 1992: Museum of local history Wedding, Frauenzimmer – Frauenräume (English Female Sphere – Women's Spaces), group exhibition, Berlin, Germany.
- 2004: Taranaki Art Gallery, Metamorphose, solo exhibition, New Plymouth, New Zealand.
- 2009: The House of Brandenburg-Prussian History, Wanderung durch die Mark-Brandenburg (English Peregrination though Mark-Brandenburg), Potsdam, Germany.
- 2009: European Commission in Germany, Mauerfall 1989 (English Fall of the Berlin Wall *1989), group exhibition, Berlin, Germany.
- 2009: Gallery at the culture centre Karlshorst, 20 Jahre Fall der Mauer (English *20 Years of the Fall of the Berlin Wall), group exhibition, Berlin, Germany.
- 2010: Cafe Club International, Ulysses period of Facebook and Twitter, group exhibition, Vienna, Austria.
- 2012: House on Kleistpark (German Haus am Kleistpark), Hildegard Ochse (1935–1997) – Das Vermächtnis einer Autorenfotografin (English Hildegard Ochse (*1935 – *1997) – The Legacy of Photographer), solo exhibition, Berlin, Germany.
- 2013: German State Parliament Brandenburg Landtag Brandenburg, TRANSITION (German WENDEZEIT) *1989 – *1991, solo exhibition, Potsdam, Germany.
- 2014: 18m Salon, BÜROZEIT u.a. Ansichten einer Autorenfotografin (English Office hours and other views of an Auteur Photographer), Berlin, Germany.
- 2015: Communal Gallery Berlin, Zwischen eigener Sicht und authentischer Realität. Das Lebenswerk der Berliner Autorenfotografin Hildegard Ochse (English Hildegard Ochse: Between Her Own Viewpoint and Authentic Reality. The Photographic Oeuvre of Hildegard Ochse), Berlin, Germany.
- 2016: C/O Berlin at the Amerika Haus, Kreuzberg – Amerika : Werkstatt für Photographie 1976 – 1986, group exhibition, Berlin, Germany.
- 2018: Gallery Schwalenberg, Starke Frauen in der Kunst – Künstlerinnen im Aufbruch zur Moderne (English Strong women in the arts – Female artist at dawn of Modernism, group exhibition, Schwalenberg, Germany.
- 2018: Forum for Fine Art, Begegnung mit der Wirklichkeit (English Encounters with reality), group exhibition, Heidelberg, Germany.
- 2018: Reinbeckhallen, Geld – Wahn – Sinn (English Money – Madness – Mind), group exhibition, Berlin, Germany.
- 2019: Wall Memorial at the German Bundestag, Was vergeth - was bleibt (English Whats gone - what stays), group exhibition, Berlin, Germany.
- 2020: Kunstmuseum Dieselkraftwerk Cottbus: 1990. Fotografische Positionen aus einem Jahr, über ein Jahr (English Photographic position of one year, over one year), group exhibition, Cottbus, Germany.
- 2020: Gallery Beate Brinkmann : EMOP Berlin 2020 - Filicudi - Seestücke und Felsen (English Filicudi - Seascapes and Rocks), solo exhibition, Berlin, Germany.
- 2025: German State Parliament Brandenburg: ZeitSprung – 35 Jahre nach der Wiedervereinigung (Englisch Time Leap – 35 Years After Reunification), group exhibition, Potsdam, Germany.
