= Abisag Tüllmann =

German woman photographer

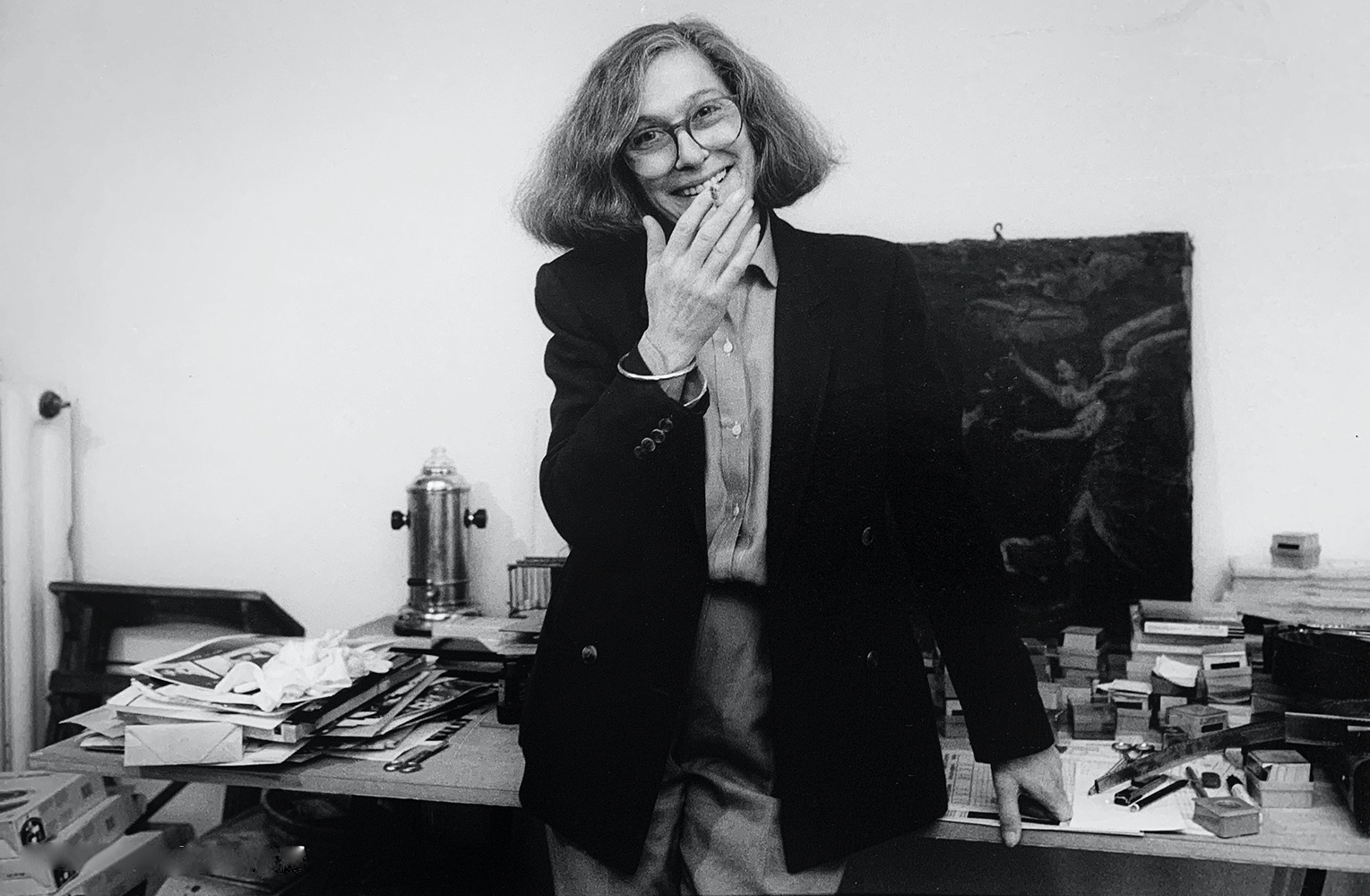
Abisag Tüllmann in 1990

Abisag Tüllmann (7 October 1935 – 24 September 1996) was a German photographer.

== Life ==
Born in Hagen, Westphalia, Tüllmann, daughter of Hedwig and Franz Tüllmann († 28 July 1945), was born with the civil name Ursula Eva Tüllmann. Her maternal grandparents were Louise Adele and Isidor Fränkel. The grandfather, who worked as a merchant, came from a Jewish family. Her father, Franz Tüllmann, a trained hairdresser, ran a Lesezirkel (reading circle) since 1928. Since his wife, "Half-Jew" trained clerk according to Nazi terminology, his father had to sell his business in 1937. After changing jobs as a hairdresser and labourer, he was sent in 1944 to Lubawka (Silesia) as a forced labourer.

Since 1946, Tüllmann lived with her mother in Wuppertal, where she attended the women's secondary school, which she finished in 1952 with the Mittlere Reife. From 1952 to 1953, Tüllmann completed an internship as a carpenter. From 1953 to 1955 she studied interior design at the Werkkunstschule in Wuppertal-Vohwinkel for four semesters. After dropping out of her studies, she first worked as a technical draughtswoman and then, from 1956 to 1957, in the Wuppertal advertising photo company it copyright, which was run by the writer Paul Pörtner.

In 1957, Tüllmann moved from Wuppertal to Frankfurt. She learned photography as a trainee for a year with the advertising photographer Dieter Jörs. In 1958, she began working for the Frankfurter Allgemeine Zeitung as well as for the Frankfurter Rundschau and Frankfurter Neue Presse.

In May 1961, Tüllmann joined the Deutscher Journalisten-Verband and henceforth called herself a freelance photojournalist. She also supplied magazines such as Der Spiegel, Die Zeit, Magnum and Publik-Forum. In Frankfurt, she developed intensive contacts to the art and cultural scene. Her friends included the writers Hermann Peter Piwitt and Ror Wolf as well as the graphic artist Hans Hillmann. At the same time, the city itself became a motif of her work, as documented by a book of photographs published in 1963 and laid out by Hans Michel. In addition, she had a great journalistic interest in Israel and reported in numerous reports from the crisis centres there.

From 1964, she also worked as a theatre photographer in Stuttgart, Bochum and Vienna, at the Schaubühne am Halleschen Ufer, at the Brussel Opera and at the Salzburg Festival. Around 1970, she began teaching photography at the Deutsche Film- und Fernsehakademie Berlin and at colleges in Kassel, Mainz, Frankfurt and Hamburg.

Tüllmann died in Frankfurt at the age of 60. She was buried in the Frankfurt Main Cemetery.

== Legacy ==
Before her death, Tüllmann had given her theatre photography to the Deutsches Theatermuseum in Munich. Posthumously, the Prussian Heritage Image Archive took over the complete photojournalistic oeuvre.

On the basis of a testamentary disposition by the artist, the Abisag Tüllmann Foundation was founded in Frankfurt in September 2008, which is financed with the proceeds from the archive. In addition to promoting publications and exhibitions of the artist's work, it also aims to promote artistic photojournalism. To this end, an Abisag Tüllmann Prize is awarded.

== Honours ==
- 1993: 1822-Kunstpreis, Frankfurt
- 1995: Sibylla-Merian-Förderpreis des hessischen Ministeriums für Kunst

== Exhibitions ==
- 2010/2011: Abisag Tüllmann 1935–1996. Bildreportagen und Theaterfotografie. 2010 Historical Museum, Frankfurt, 2011 Museum of Photography, Berlin.

== Publications ==
- Großstadt. Foreword Richard Kirn; de./en./fr. Societät, Frankfurt 1963.
- Bettina Decke, Abisag Tüllmann: Betrifft: Rhodesia. Unterdrückung und Widerstand in einer Siedlerkolonie. Megapress, Edition Mega, Frankfurt 1974, ISBN 3-87979004-3.
- Kursbuch 59 – Bilderbuch. Mit Fotografien von Abisag Tüllmann, Giovanni Rinaldi, Inge Rambow and others. Rotbuch, Berlin 1980.
- Unsere Welt. Bilder aus dem Schauspielhaus Bochum. Spielzeit 1981/82. Bochum 1982.
- Jean-Christophe Ammann (ed.): Abisag Tüllmann – Photographien. Museum für Moderne Kunst, Frankfurt, 1995, ISBN 978-3-88270473-0.
- Abisag Tüllmann Photographien; [anlässlich der Präsentation des Werkes von Abisag Tüllmann im Museum für Moderne Kunst im Frühjahr 1995].

== Documentary ==
- Claudia von Alemann: Die Frau mit der Kamera: Porträt der Fotografin Abisag Tüllmann. 80 Minuten, Deutschland 2011.

== Catalogue ==
- Museum für Moderne Kunst (ed.): Photographien. Text contributions from Jean-Christophe Ammann and Olof Hansen. Frankfurt, 1995.
- Martha Caspers (ed.): Abisag Tüllmann 1935–1996. Bildreportagen und Theaterfotografie. Exhibition at the Historisches Museum Frankfurt. Hatje Cantz Verlag, Ostfildern 2011 ISBN 978-3-7757-2708-2

== Sources ==
- Volker Breidecker: Immer im Umbruch. In Süddeutsche Zeitung, No 55, 8 March 2011, p. 12.
