= Berlin State Library =

State library in Germany

- Staatsbibliothek zu Berlin

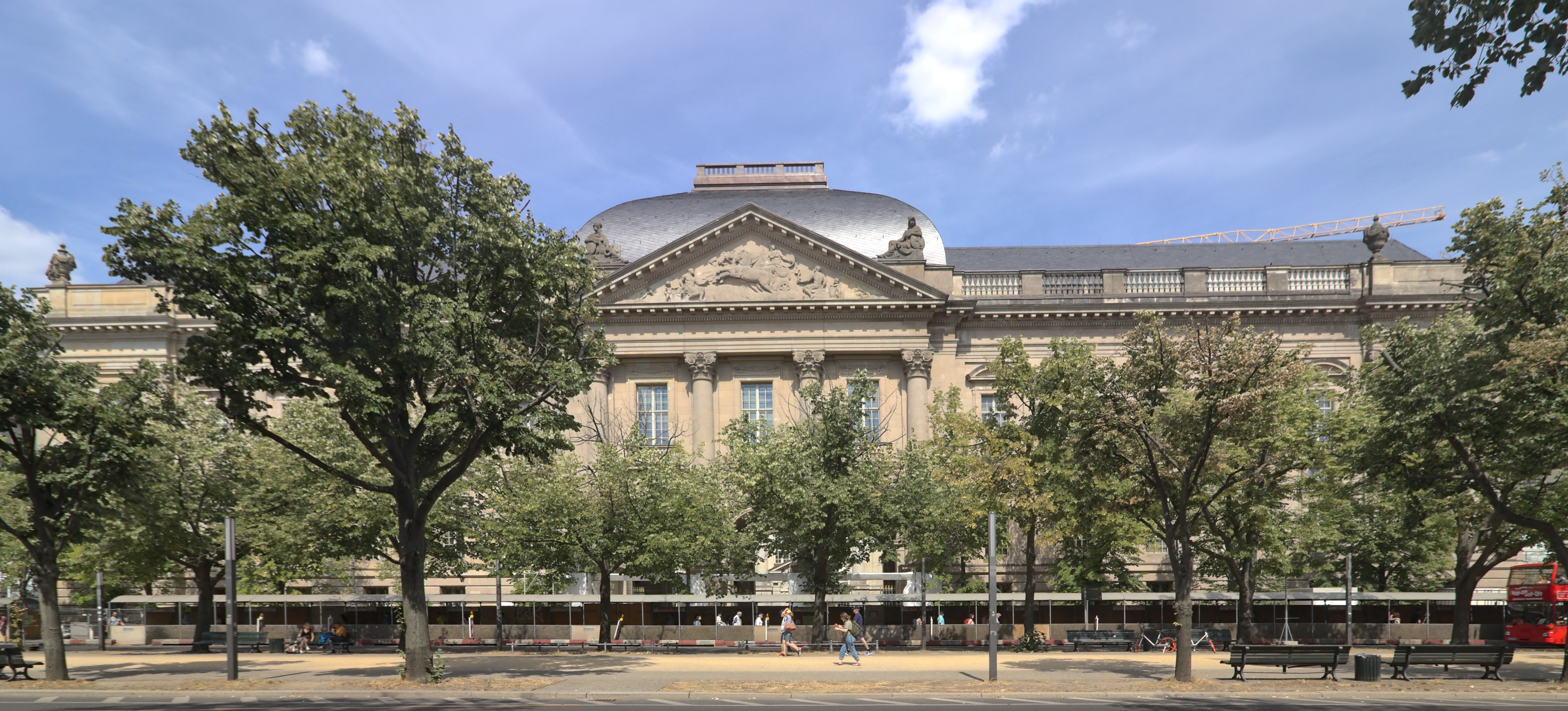
- Unter den Linden, one of the two main buildings of the library
- 52°30′26″N 13°22′15″E
- Location: Unter den Linden 8, Potsdamer Platz 33, Westhafenstraße 1, Berlin, Germany, Germany
- Type: Universal library, Public library
- Established: 1661; 365 years ago

Collection
- Items collected: books, journals, newspapers, magazines, music autographs, databases, maps, prints, drawings, incunabula and manuscripts
- Size: 23,110,423; Consists of 12.3 million books; 206,700 rare books; 60,100 manuscripts; music autographs; 1,600 estate archives; 25,000 periodicals; 180,000 newspaper volumes; 4,300 databases; 2.7 million microfilms; 13.5 million images at the bpk
- Legal deposit: Yes, German parliament and government publications

Access and use
- Access requirements: any person over 16 years of age
- Circulation: 1.7 million

Other information
- Budget: ~€16,000,000
- Director: Achim Bonte
- Website: staatsbibliothek-berlin.de

The Berlin State Library (German: Staatsbibliothek zu Berlin; officially abbreviated as SBB, colloquially Stabi) is a universal library in Berlin, Germany, and a property of the German public cultural organization the Prussian Cultural Heritage Foundation (German: Stiftung Preußischer Kulturbesitz).

Founded in 1661, it is among the largest libraries in Europe, and one of the most important academic research libraries in the German-speaking world. It collects texts, media and cultural works from all fields across many languages, from all time periods and all countries of the world, and offers them for academic and research purposes.

Prominent items in its collection include the oldest biblical illustrations in the fifth-century Quedlinburg Itala fragment, a Gutenberg Bible, the main autograph collection of Goethe, the world's largest collection of Johann Sebastian Bach's and Wolfgang Amadeus Mozart's manuscripts, and the original score of Ludwig van Beethoven's Symphony № 9.

== Central functions and cooperation with other libraries ==
The SBB is one of six libraries forming the Arbeitsgemeinschaft Sammlung Deutscher Drucke (AG SDD) which "collaborate to build a comprehensive collection of printed literature published in German-speaking countries from the beginning of letterpress printing to the present, to provide information on it, to make it accessible to the public and to preserve it for future generations." This creates a "distributed" national library, in which each library is responsible for a given period, of which the SBB covers 1871–1912 for regular prints, 1801–1912 for maps and newspapers, and 1801–1945 for musical scores.

Within the cooperation of German and Austrian libraries, the SBB is responsible "for the maintenance and further development of the ZDB", the central periodicals database. "The ZDB actually contains more than 1.8 million bibliographic records of serials from the 16th century onward, from all countries, in all languages, held in 3700 German and Austrian libraries, with 15.6 million holdings information. It does not contain contents, i. e. journal articles."

The SBB is one of 12 libraries and archives with significant holdings of historical documents which form the Allianz Schriftliches Kulturgut Erhalten (DE) (English: Alliance to Preserve Written Cultural Heritage). This alliance sets itself as main task raising the consciousness of the importance to preserve the century-old cultural heritage both by securing the physical integrity of the objects in question as well as making them available in digitized form, thus preventing their deterioration by use.

The SBB itself is digitizing its holdings and offers digitized newspapers for public access via the Web through their "newspaper information system" ZEFYS, or Zeitungsinformationssystem. ZEFYS "currently provides total of 281990 issues from 192 historical newspapers from Germany and foreign newspapers in german."

== History ==
The history of the Berlin State Library closely parallels that of German history. It has lived through creation, neglect, expansion, war damage, division, unification and re-creation like few other libraries.

=== Library of kings ===
In the early period, the fortunes of the State Library rose and fell on royal whims. In 1658 Frederick William, Elector of Brandenburg decreed that his private books be organized, cataloged and made available to the public. His library opened in 1661 at Cölln as the "Library of the Elector" (German: Churfürstliche Bibliothek zu Cölln an der Spree). In 1699, Frederick I more than doubled the collection, extended opening hours and introduced the first Prussian legal deposit law. In 1701 it was renamed the "Royal Library" (German: Königliche Bibliothek) upon Frederick I's accession as first King of Prussia. Frederick William I then cancelled the acquisition budget in 1722 and gave away the valuable scientific collection to the Prussian Academy of Sciences in 1735. Frederick the Great also cared little for the library at first, preferring instead his own literature in the French language. However, in 1770 he granted the library substantial assets and it made several important acquisitions. To avoid the problems caused by its dependence on the crown, Frederick the Great also granted the library considerable autonomy.

=== Rise to preeminence ===
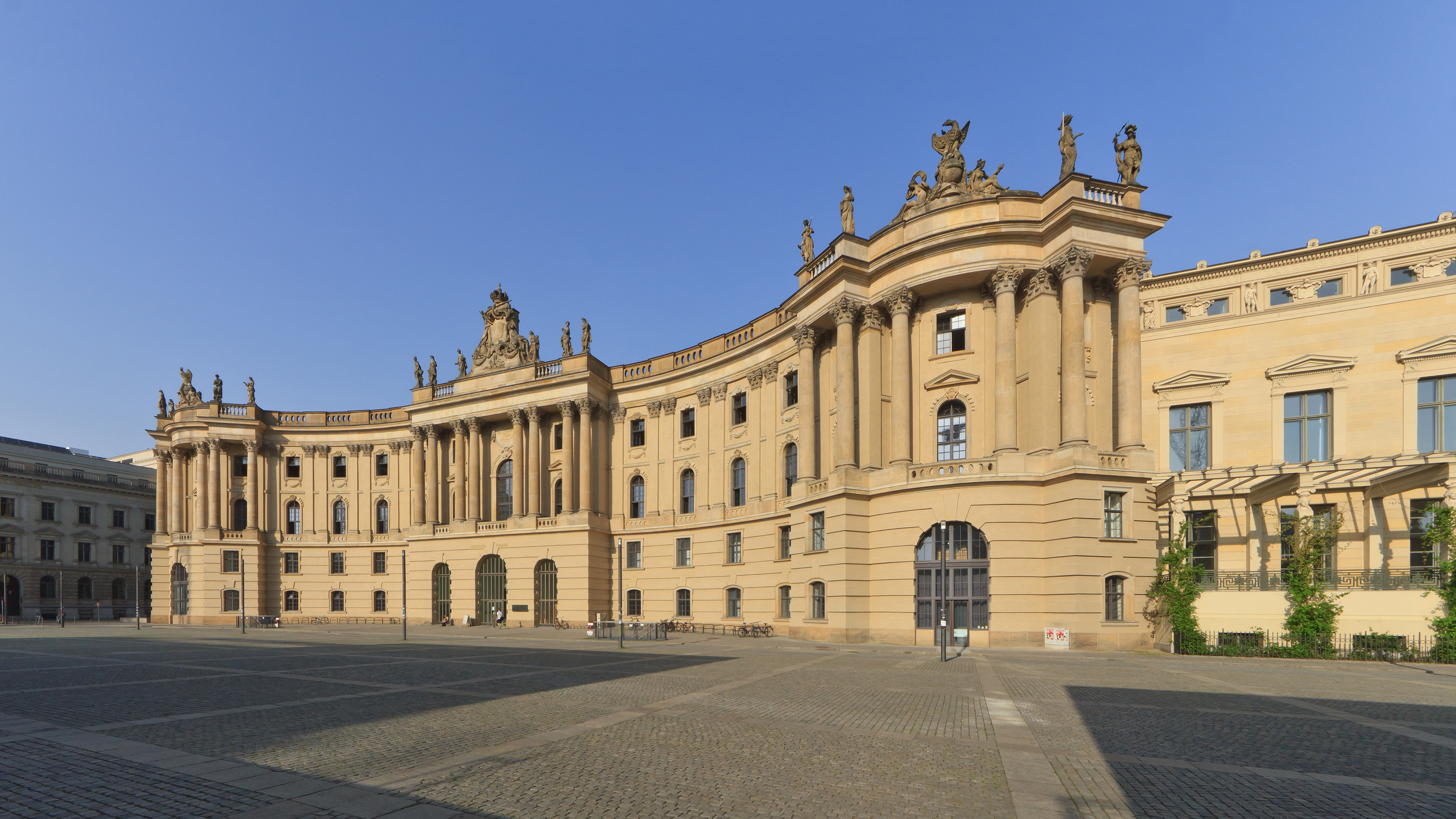
Old Royal Library on Bebelplatz, built between 1775 and 1785

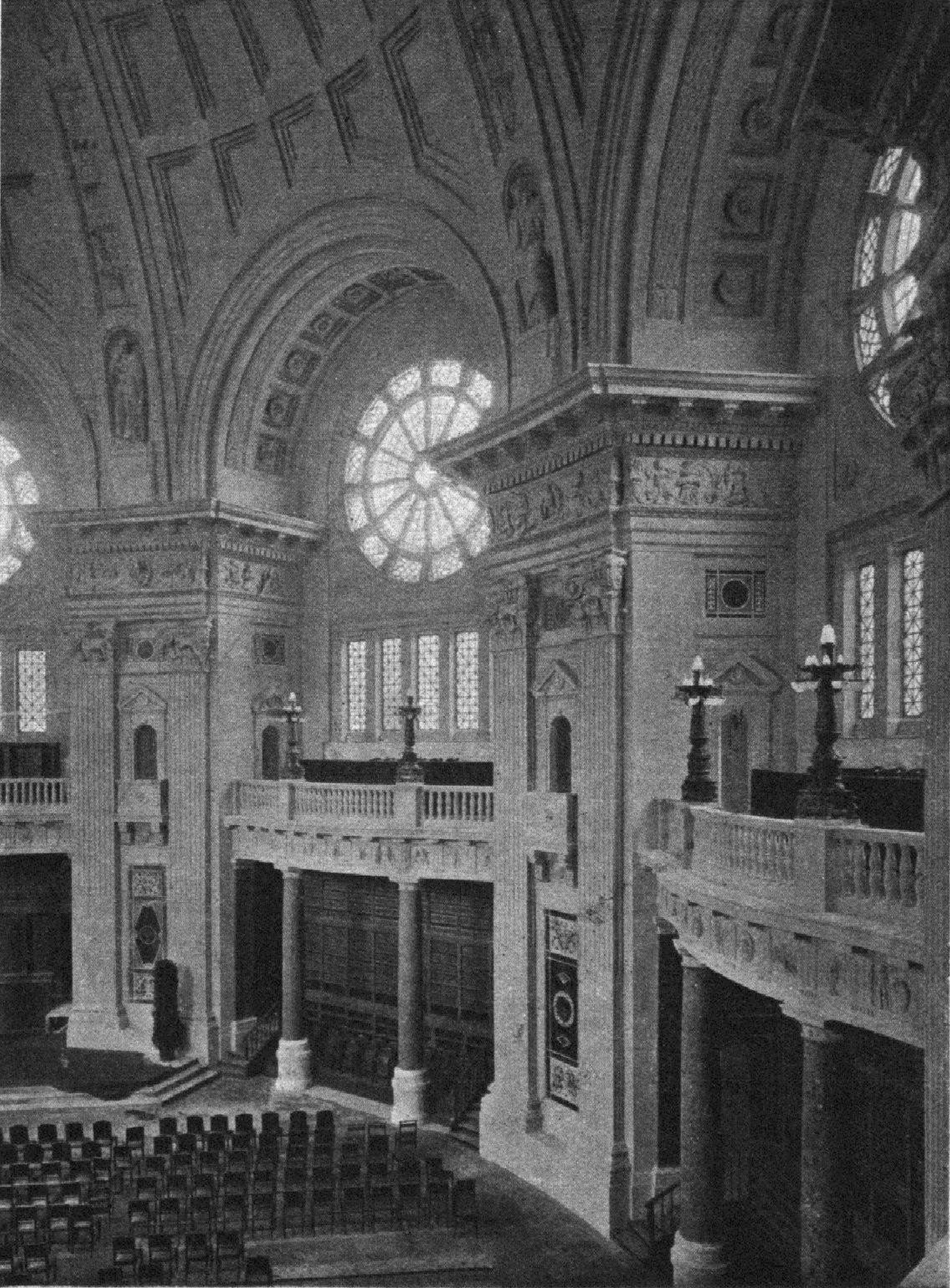
Main Reading Room of the new library building, constructed between 1903 and 1914

With new resources and authority, construction began on a Royal Library building on the Bebelplatz in the center of Berlin. Built between 1775 and 1785 by Georg Christian Unger to plans by Joseph Emanuel Fischer von Erlach, it was nicknamed the Kommode (Chest of drawers) after its Baroque design. The collection then underwent nearly continuous improvement and expansion. By 1905 it had become the largest and most influential repository of materials in the German language, and at 1.2 million books one of the largest libraries in the world. The Bebelplatz building housed the library until 1914, when the headquarters moved into new, even larger premises on Unter den Linden, designed by court architect Ernst von Ihne. This was the height of the library's development before the First World War. Today the old Royal building houses the Faculty of Law of Humboldt University.

At the founding of the Weimar Republic the Royal Library was renamed the "Prussian State Library" (German: Preußische Staatsbibliothek – Preussischer Staatsbibliothek). After 1919, economic effects of war and inflation on the library were mitigated through the active support of the Emergency Association of German Sciences (after 1930, the German Research Foundation).

=== War and destruction ===
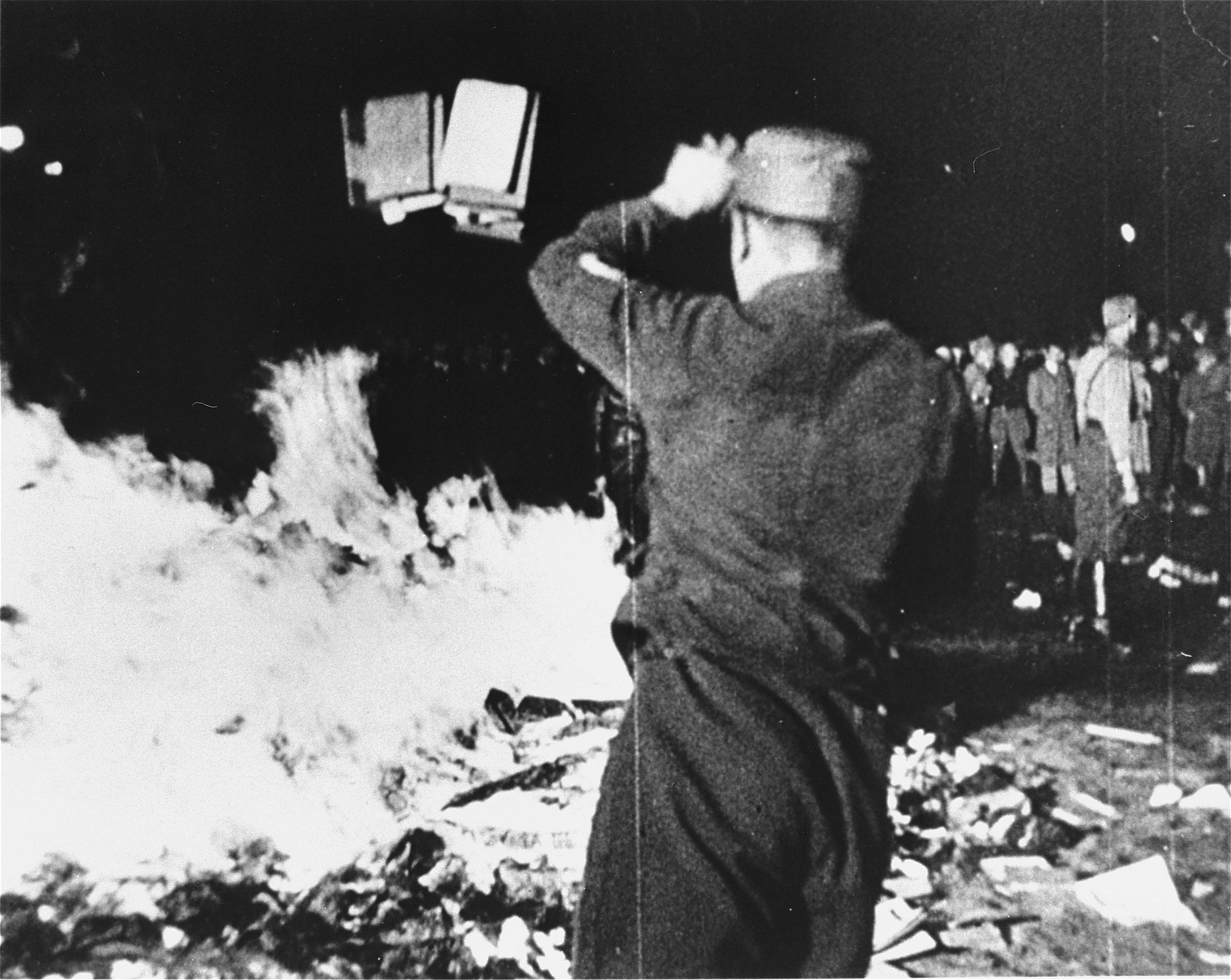
Book burning on the Bebelplatz, May 1933

The Nazi period severely damaged the institution through political intimidation, employee dismissals, restrictions on foreign acquisitions and the effects of World War II. On 10 May 1933 a book burning ceremony was held at the Bebelplatz by members of the Deutsche Studentenschaft, the National Socialist German Students' League, Sturmabteilung "brownshirts" and Hitler Youth groups at the instigation of the Propaganda Minister, Joseph Goebbels. The Nazis burned over 20,000 books – mostly from the neighboring University, not the State library itself – including works by Thomas Mann, Erich Maria Remarque, Heinrich Heine, Karl Marx and many others. Today a glass plate set into the Bebelplatz, giving a view of empty bookcases, commemorates the event. After an Allied bomb hit the Unter den Linden building in 1941, the various holdings (consisting of some 3 million volumes and over 7,400 incunabula) were evacuated to 30 monasteries, castles, and abandoned mines around Germany. By the end of the war, the main building was severely damaged, the valuable collections were distributed across the Allied zones of occupation, the library staff had scattered or been killed, and 700,000 volumes had been either destroyed or lost. With the formal dissolution of the State of Prussia in 1947, support for the library ended and the Prussian State Library ceased to exist.

=== Rebuilding and reunification ===
After 1945, parts of the collection that had been hidden in what became the Soviet occupation zone were returned to the war-damaged Unter den Linden building in East Berlin. It first opened in 1946 as the Public Scientific Library (German: Öffentliche Wissenschaftliche Bibliothek). When further restoration work was completed in 1955, the library was renamed the German State Library (German: Deutsche Staatsbibliothek). The great domed reading room, however, remained a ruin in the center of the building.

A larger proportion of the collection wound up in the American occupation zone, including a cache of 1.5 million volumes hidden in a potash mine near Hattorf, and was moved to the University of Marburg in 1946. This collection first opened to the public as the Hessian Library (German: Hessische Bibliothek) and in 1949, as the last lost stores arrived, it was renamed the West German Library (German: Westdeutsche Bibliothek). Those parts of the collection that had been in the French occupation zone, mainly at Beuron Archabbey, were gathered to the University of Tübingen. In 1962 the Federal Republic passed a law giving administrative responsibility for all these collections to Prussian Cultural Heritage Foundation and endowed it with State funding. During the 1960s, the various stocks, services and personnel began to be relocated to West Berlin. To house it all, a grand new building complex on the Kulturforum was constructed near the Berlin Wall, just 1.5 km (0.93 mi) away from the library in East Berlin.

After German Reunification, the two institutions were formally reunited in 1992. The new West Berlin building and the original East Berlin building became "one library with two homes" and the old State Library was reborn as the Berlin State Library. From 2000 until 2012 Berlin State Library was refurbished by German architect HG Merz. The destroyed reading room, the core of the building, was replaced by a glass cube.

=== Legacies of the past ===
Many important items from the original collection are now located in Poland and territories of the former Soviet Union – declared as war reparations, sometimes controversially – such as the Berlinka Art Collection. The original score of Beethoven's 8th Symphony is a starker example of division: while the first, second and fourth movements are in Berlin, the third is kept in Kraków. Conversely, it is estimated that about 10,000 volumes and 9,000 other items in the Berlin State Library are there as a result of Nazi plunder. As such, repatriation and self-criticism about these materials became controversial issues, so in 2005 the Prussian Cultural Heritage Foundation established the Center for Provenance Research to resolve the problems. For example, in 2008 a library user found an encyclopedia entitled Religion in History and the Present Day with a bookplate indicating it once belonged to a Jewish theologian. Library staff managed to find his widow in Israel, but she wrote back: "I appreciate your offer to return this book to me, but I have no use for it now."

== Locations ==
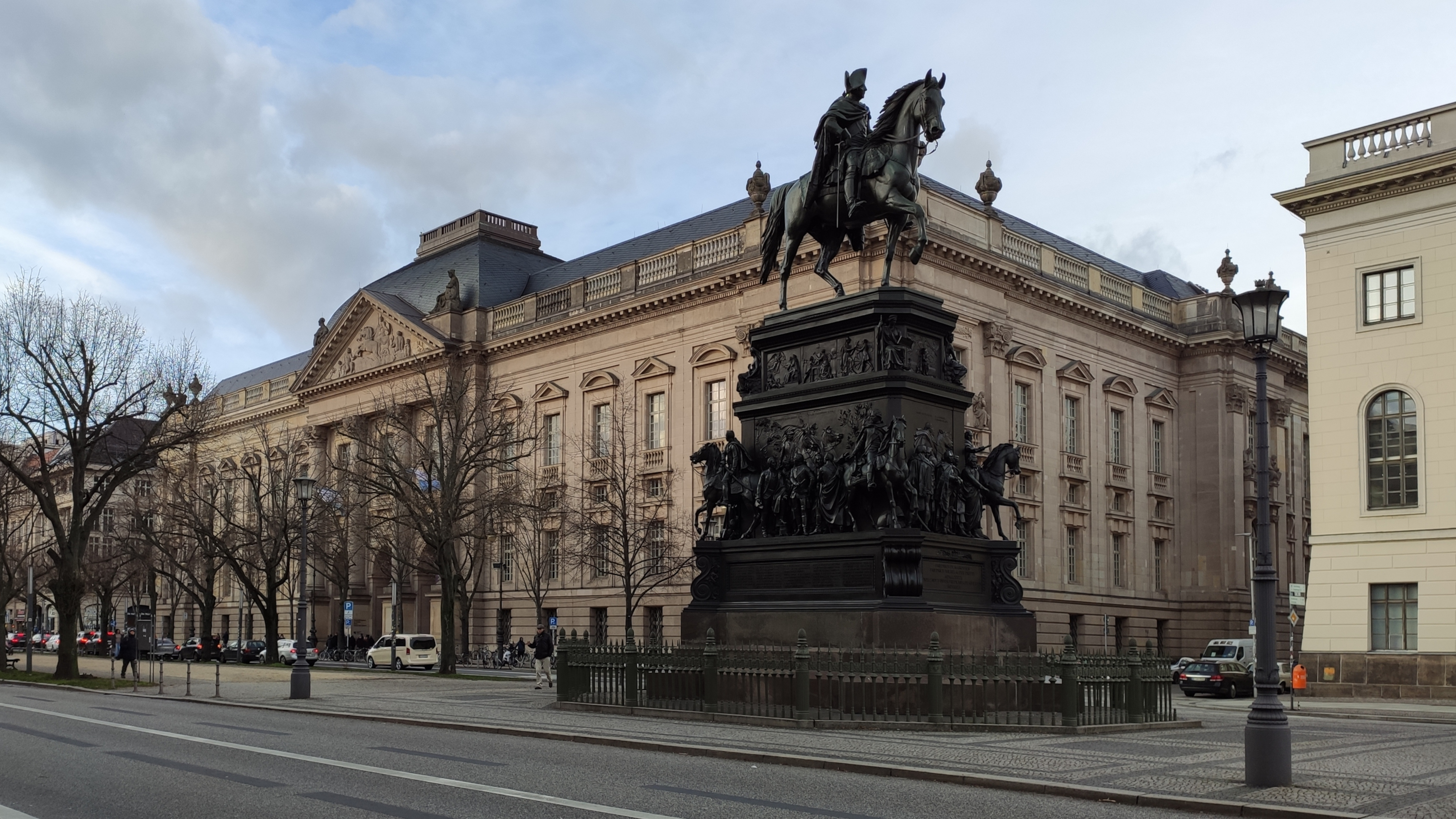
Haus Unter den Linden

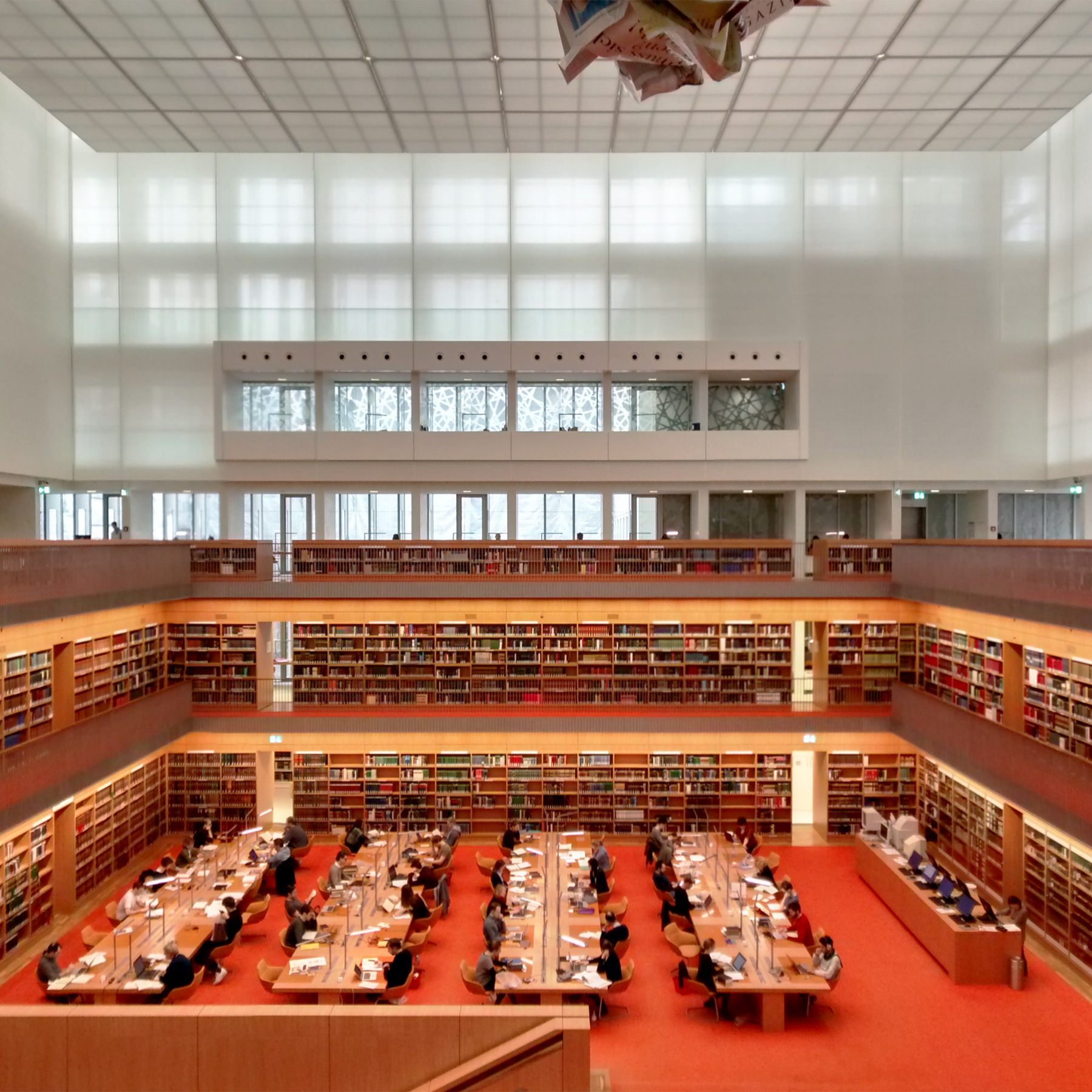
New reading room in the Haus Unter den Linden

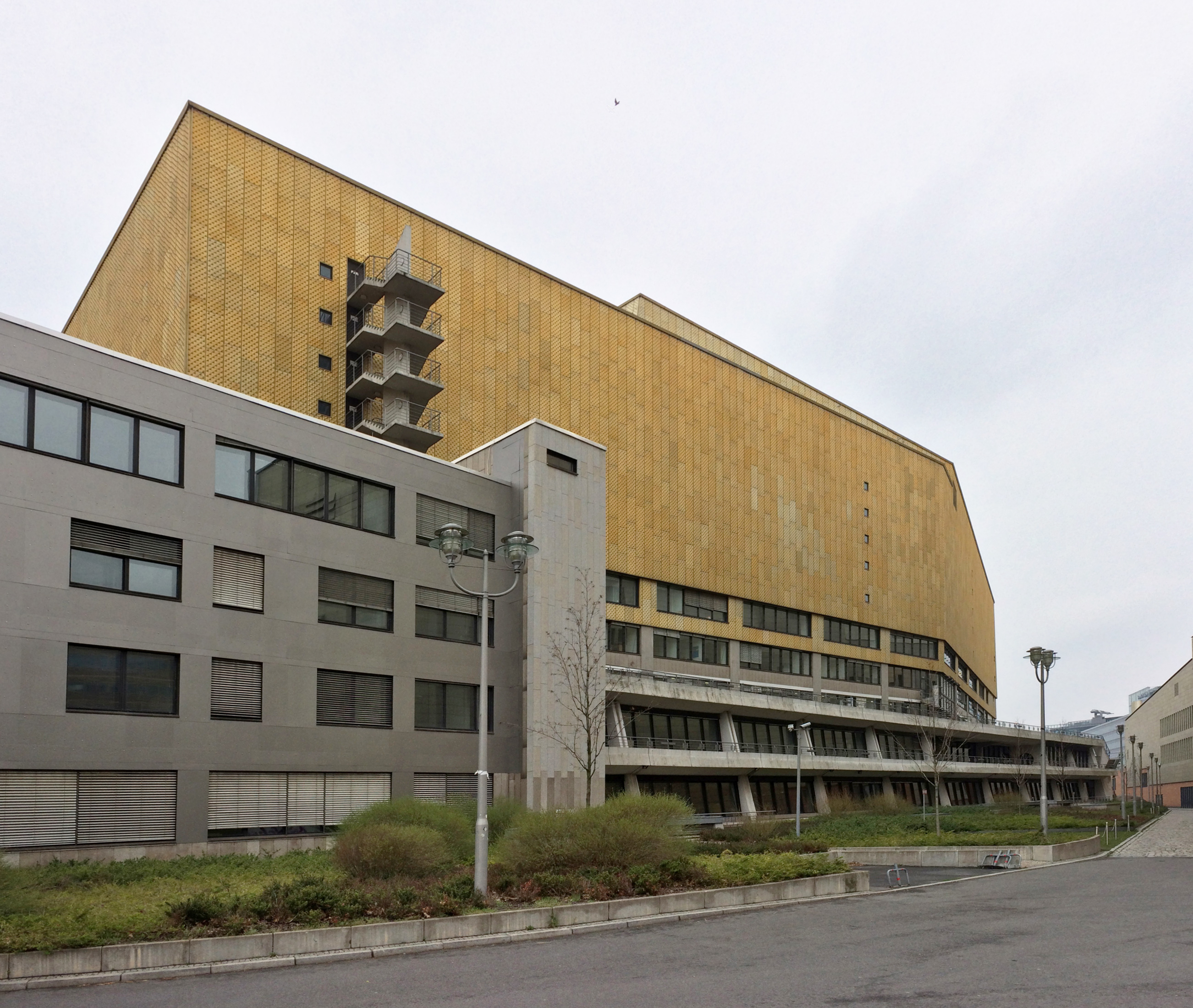
Haus Potsdamer Straße

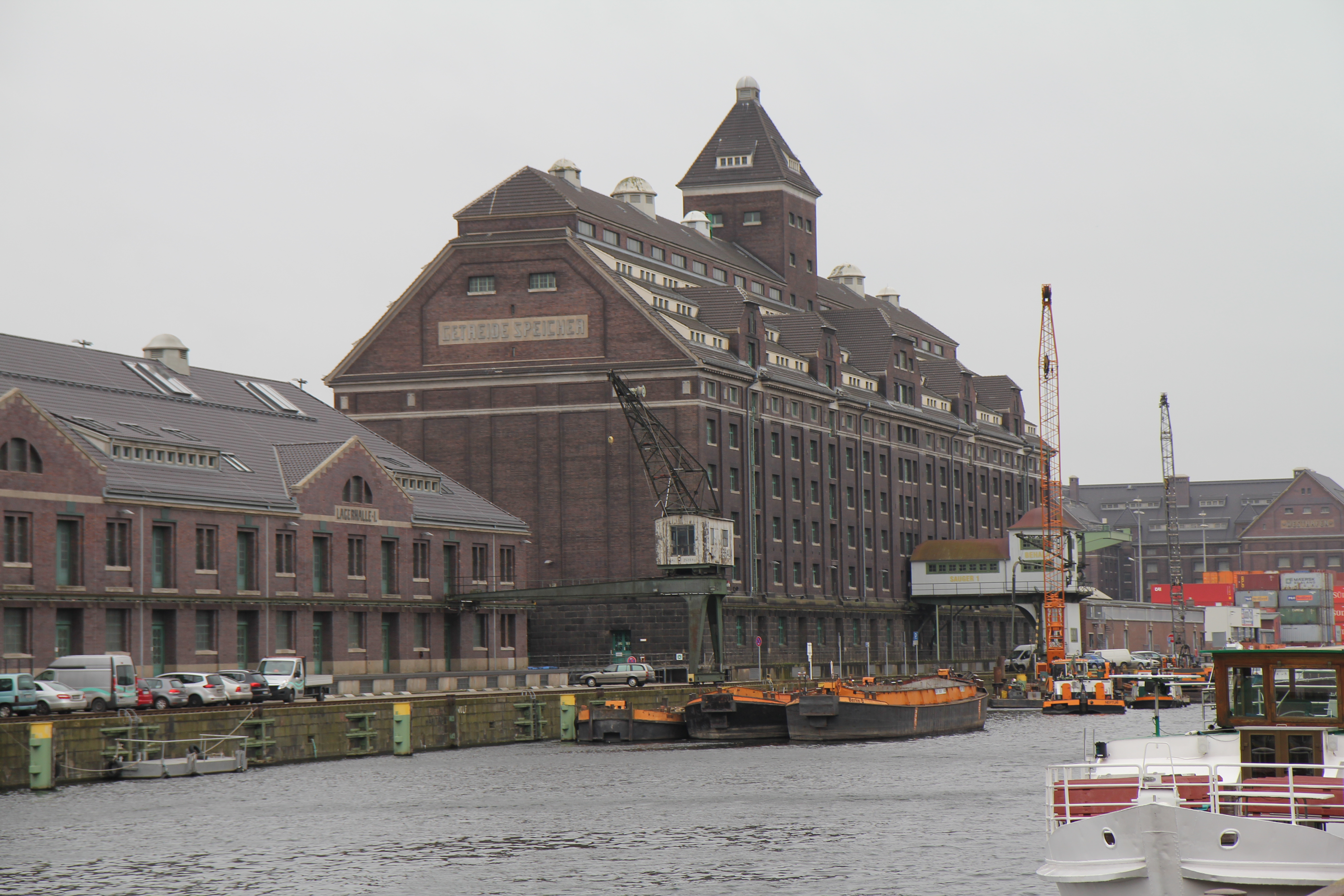
Former Westhafen Granary housing the newspaper department and children's library

The State Library operates from two major public sites, Haus Unter Den Linden and Haus Potsdamer Straße, called the "Library in Two Homes". There are additional subsidiary locations for newspapers, magazines, and archives not open to the public.

=== Haus Unter Den Linden ===
The original main building was built between 1908 and 1913 by the Prussian Construction and Financial Directorate of Berlin, then responsible for public constructions in the city. The Neo Baroque design is by popular Wilhelmine court architect Ernst von Ihne and was further adapted by Alexander Baerwald, who was in charge of the construction management. In front of the building is an equestrian statue of Frederick the Great. The building was 40% damaged during World War II, and after the division of Berlin wound up in East Berlin. After delays and cost overruns, a 15 year restoration project was finally completed in January 2021, including a new translucent central reading room on the ruins of the old dome. The central location is now the historical research library housing the collection up to and including 1945. As part of the restoration a museum was incorporated in the museum's ground floor. The so called Stabi Kulturwerk houses exhibits on the library's histories and a selection of valuable books and manuscripts.

=== Haus Potsdamer Straße ===
This is the newer building in the Kulturforum on Potsdamer Straße in West Berlin, designed by Hans Scharoun with substantial participation by Edgar Wisniewski. Construction began in 1967 to house those parts of the library's evacuated holdings from the western Allied occupation zones at the end of World War II. After 11 years of construction, it was finally dedicated by Federal President Walter Scheel and opened to the public in 1978. It was renovated from 1999 to 2001. The building is currently being further redeveloped into a modern research library as a companion to the Haus Unter den Linden and will house the collection from 1946 onwards.

In February 2026, the Prussian Cultural Heritage Foundation announced that beginning in 2030, the Potsdamer Straße location would close for eleven years for intensive renovations. The German Federal Government will contribute 1.1 billion euros. The renovations include the removal of an estimated thirty tons of harmful material, including asbestos. Because the building has historical monument status, each piece of the building must be "photographed, cataloged, and numbered before it is cleaned and stored," the official leading the renovation project told the Tagesspiegel.

=== Additional sites ===
- Westhafen: located in Berlin-Moabit, this building is a renovated granary and houses the newspaper collection and the children's and youth's library. It also serves as a temporary site for other major collections while the Unter den Linden building is renovated.
- Friedrichshagen Storage Magazine: located in Friedrichshagen and originally constructed in 1950 for various scientific agencies of the German Democratic Republic, this site was renovated and expanded in 2011 into a technologically advanced storage facility for cultural artifacts. It encompasses 22,000 square metres (240,000 sq ft) of climate-controlled space, and plans are in place to triple its size.

== Collection ==
- More than 11 million books
- More than 200,000 rare books
- 4,442 incunabula
- 18,300 occidental manuscripts (including parts of the Nibelungenlied)
- 42,170 oriental manuscripts (including early Ming block prints)
- 250,000 autographs (including Lessing, Goethe, Kleist)
- 66,350 music autographs
- 1,400 estate archives (including the Mendelssohn family)
- 460,000 editions of sheet music
- 1.1 million maps, atlases and globes (including the world's largest bound atlas)
- 38,000 subscription periodicals and monographic series
- 180,000 early newspaper volumes
- 22,900 printed and magazines
- 24,400 licensed electronic newspapers
- 4,700 databases
- 2.3 million microfiches and microfilms
- 13.5 million images at the Prussian Heritage Image Archive

Among the library's most precious treasures are the Psalter of Louis the German dating from the 9th century and an elaborately adorned copy of the Gutenberg Bible. The oldest handwritten book in the collection is a Coptic codex of the biblical Book of Proverbs dating from the 3rd century; the oldest printed book is an 8th-century Buddhist text from Japan, the Hyakumantó Darani.

The library also has an extensive collection of important music manuscripts, including 80% of all the autographs of Johann Sebastian Bach and Wolfgang Amadeus Mozart, the largest collection in the world. Famous examples include Bach's Mass in B Minor, the St. Matthew and St. John Passions, and nearly all of Mozart's operas. In addition to Ludwig van Beethoven's 4th, 5th, and 8th Symphonies, the Library also holds the autograph score, autograph leaves, and historic records of Beethoven's Symphony No. 9, which was added to UNESCO's Memory of the World Register in 2001.

Other notable items are a 1491 Map of Germany by Nikolaus von Kues, the Atlas of The Great Elector (German: Atlas des Großen Kurfürsten), the Jahangir-Album from around 1600, and the largest Hebrew Bible and the largest parchment Torah scroll in the world.

== Notable librarians ==
Several notable scholars have held positions at the library, among them:

- Georg Heinrich Pertz, head librarian 1842–1873
- Valentin Rose, chairman of manuscript department 1886–1905
- Karl Richard Lepsius, head librarian 1873–1884
- Adolf von Harnack, head librarian 1905–1921

== In film ==
The western library played a starring role in Wim Wenders' Wings of Desire. Two angels, the stars of the film, read the thoughts of the library's patrons.

== See also ==
- Berlin Central and Regional Library (ZLB)
- German National Library (DNB)
- German National Library of Economics (ZBW)
- German National Library of Medicine (ZB MED)
- German National Library of Science and Technology (TIB)
- Kunstbibliothek Berlin
- Prussian Cultural Heritage Foundation
- Prussian Heritage Image Archive
- Schulprogramm (historical)
