= Walter Höllerer =

German writer, literary critic, and professor (1922–2003)

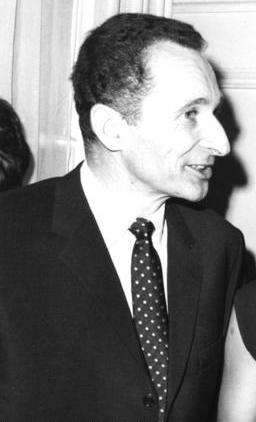
Walter Höllerer in 1966

Walter Höllerer (19 December 1922 – 20 May 2003) was a German writer, literary critic, and literature academic. He was professor of literary studies at Technische Universität Darmstadt from 1959 to 1988. Höllerer was a member of the Group 47, founder of the German literary magazine Akzente (1953) and the Literary Colloquium of Berlin (1963).

== Biography ==
Walter Höllerer was born in Sulzbach-Rosenberg, Bavaria. He joined the Wehrmacht and became a soldier in 1942 during the Second World War. After 1945 he studied philology, philosophy, history, German studies, and comparative literature at the Universities of Erlangen–Nuremberg, Göttingen, and Heidelberg; in 1949 he earned a Doctor title at the University of Erlangen–Nuremberg with a dissertation on the Swiss writer Gottfried Keller. He worked as a lecturer assistant from 1954 to 1958 at the Goethe University Frankfurt. In 1954, he attended regular sessions with the Group 47, which was a group of young German authors who spoke about post-war Germany literary activities from the west BRD. During the early 1960s he moderated literature broadcasts on a free broadcasting channel of Berlin. From 1959 to his retirement in 1988 he was a professor of literary studies at Technische Universität Darmstadt. Meanwhile, he undertook research with a lot of professors from the United States. In 1973 he took up a "joint professorship" for German and comparative literature at the University of Illinois Urbana-Champaign, teaching there for one semester every two years until the early the 1990s.

During his literary research he published poems and novels, and put together critical statements for other literary works. In 1954 Höllerer started publishing the bimonthly literary magazine Akzente, one of the most important literature forums in the Federal Republic of Germany. In 1961 Höllerer published the quarterly journal, Sprache im technischen Zeitalter ("Language in the Age of Technology"); in 1963 he founded the Literary Colloquium of Berlin. Through his efforts as a publisher and critic and a professor at TU Berlin he helped writers with the post-WWII era of German literature. In 1965 Höllerer married a photographer from Mangoldt, Renate, she previously had two sons. He was a member of the Deutsche Akademie für Sprache und Dichtung. In 1977 he founded literary archives in Sulzbach-Rosenberg, which he then donated all issues of the magazine Akzente into the archives.

In 1966 he was honored with the Fontane-Award and in 1993 together with Robert Creeley, the Horst-Bienek-award for lyrics and in 1994 the Rahel-Varnhagen-von-Ense-Medaille from Berlin. He was also honorary citizen and culture award-winning from the city Sulzbach-Rosenberg.

Robert Neumann harshly criticized Höllerer's leading role in the Group 47 and in the literary scene. He obtained research from Christoph König that Höllerer was a member of the Nazi Party in 1941. Höllerer replied that he had not received any confirmation of being accepted in the party.

Höllerer was laid to rest at the Friedhof Heerstraße in Berlin. His widow Renate donated the archive Sulzbach-Rosenberg as a gift to Walter Höllerers research, which since 2007 has been developed and been researched even more. Since 19 April 2007, the Sulzbach-Rosenberg school changed its name to Walter-Höllerer-Realschule.

== List of works ==
=== Non-fiction ===
- Gottfried Kellers "Leute von Seldwyla" als Spiegel einer geistesgeschichtlichen Wende. Eine Studie zur Geschichte der Novelle im 19. Jahrhundert. Erlangen 1949
- Zwischen Klassik und Moderne. Lachen und Weinen in der Dichtung einer Übergangszeit. Klett, Stuttgart 1958; new edition: SH, Köln 2005, ISBN 3-89498-133-4
- Theorie der modernen Lyrik. Dokumente zur Poetik 1. Rowohlt, Reinbek 1965
  - Advanced new edition in 2 volumes: Hanser, München 2003, ISBN 3-446-20386-9
- Modernes Theater auf kleinen Bühnen. Literal Colloquium, Berlin 1965

=== Literary works ===
- Der andere Gast. Hanser, München 1952
- Gedichte. Beigefügt: Wie entsteht ein Gedicht? Suhrkamp, Frankfurt am Main 1964
- Systeme. Neue Gedichte. Literarisches Colloquium, Berlin 1969
- Die Elephantenuhr. Suhrkamp, Frankfurt 1973, ISBN 3-518-03271-2; Paperback ed. 1975, ISBN 3-518-06766-4
- Geschichte, die nicht im Geschichtsbuch steht. Kopp, Sulzbach-Rosenberg 1976
- Alle Vögel, alle. Eine Komödie in 2 Akten samt einem Bericht und Anmerkungen zum Theater. Suhrkamp, Frankfurt 1978, ISBN 3-518-03272-0
- Gedichte 1942–1982. Suhrkamp, Frankfurt 1982, ISBN 3-518-03273-9
- Oberpfälzische Weltei-Erkundungen. Weiden 1987, ISBN 978-3-924350-09-3

=== As editor ===
- Junge amerikanische Lyrik (with Gregory Corso). Hanser, München 1960
- Transit. Lyrikbuch der Jahrhundertmitte. Mit Randnotizen. Suhrkamp, Frankfurt 1956
- Movens. Dokumente und Analysen zur Dichtung, bildenden Kunst, Musik, Architektur. Limes, Wiesbaden 1960
- Spiele in einem Akt. 35 exemplarische Stücke. Suhrkamp, Frankfurt 1961
- Ein Gedicht und sein Autor. Lyrik und Essay. Literal Colloquium, Berlin 1967
- Dramaturgisches. Ein Briefwechsel (with Max Frisch). Literal Colloquium, Berlin 1969
- Welt aus Sprache. Auseinandersetzung mit Zeichen und Zeichensystemen der Gegenwart. Art Academy, Berlin 1972
- Zurufe, Widerspiele. Aufsätze zu Dichtern und Gedichten (with Michael Krüger). Berlin Scientific Publishing, Berlin 1993, ISBN 3-87061-405-6

=== Films ===
- Literatur im technischen Zeitalter, TV series, 13 films, Sender Freies Berlin, 1961/62, First episode: 13 November 1961
- Berlin stellt vor. TV series, 39 films, Sender Freies Berlin, 1962, First episode: 28 May 1962
- Modernes Theater auf kleinen Bühnen, TV series, 10 films, Sender Freies Berlin, 1964/65, First episode: 18 November 1964
- Der weiße Hopfengarten, 1966
- Ein Gedicht und sein Autor, TV series, 11 films, Sender Freies Berlin, 1966/67, First episode: 1 December 1966
- Die Alexanderschlacht, 1968
- Das literarische Profil von Prag, 1969
- Das literarische Profil von Stockholm, 1969
- Das literarische Profil von London, 1970
- Das literarische Profil von Rom, 1970
- Das literarische Profil von Berlin, 1971
- Vögel und Fluggespenster, 1973
