= Akzente =

German literary magazine

- Categories: Literary magazine
- Frequency: Quarterly
- Circulation: 3,300
- Publisher: Carl Hanser Verlag
- Founder: Walter Höllerer
- Founded: 1953
- Country: Germany
- Based in: Munich
- Language: German
- Website: Akzente
- ISSN: 0002-3957

Akzente is a German literary magazine that was founded in 1953 by Walter Höllerer and Hans Bender. From February 1954 to 2014, it appeared every two months in the Carl Hanser Verlag, Munich, with the subtitle "Zeitschrift für Literatur" (Journal of Literature). Since 2015, the magazine is published quarterly. Its main focuses are placed on lyric poetry and short prose.

Walter Höllerer was co-editor until 1967. Hans Bender was the sole publisher until 1975 and was later supported by Michael Krüger. From 1981 to 2014 Michael Krüger was the sole publisher. Important writers whose texts were published in the 1950s and 1960s included Thomas Mann, Elias Canetti, Erich Fried, Peter Weiss, Hilde Domin, Ernst Meister, Paul Celan and Nelly Sachs. Many texts of the Group 47 were first published in Akzente. Including texts from Ingeborg Bachmann, Martin Walser, Hans Magnus Enzensberger, Uwe Johnson, Ilse Aichinger and Günter Grass.

In 1974, the first 20 years of the newspaper was reissued by publisher Zweitausendeins in a seven-volume paperback issue (with the complete contents of Karl Rudolf Pigge).

Beginning in 2015, the magazine is published four times a year in a larger format. Each issue is dedicated to a special theme, to which editor Jo Lendle invites a co-editor.
