= James Simon =

James or Jim Simon may refer to:

- James Simon (art collector) (1851–1932), German entrepreneur, art collector, philanthropist and arts patron
  - James Simon Gallery in Berlin
- James Simon (1858–1925), businessman in Brenham, Texas
- James Simon (composer) (1880–1944), German composer, pianist and musicologist
- James D. Simon (1897–1982), Louisiana politician and jurist
- Jim Simon (American football) (born 1940), American offensive lineman
- Jim Simon (artist) (born 1950), American cartoonist
- James Simon (sculptor) (born c. 1954), American sculptor and mosaic artist
- Jim Avila (born James Joseph Simon; 1955–2025), American television journalist
- James Simon (journalist), journalism professor at Fairfield University, Fairfield, Connecticut

== See also ==
- James Simons (disambiguation)
- Simon James (disambiguation)
