= Simon James =

Simon James may refer to:

- Simon James (academic), English academic
- Simon James (archaeologist), British archaeologist
- Simon James (musician) (born 1954), of Acoustic Alchemy
- Simon James, UK radio presenter, see Simon James and Hill
- Simon Porritt, Australian CEO, acted under the name Simon James
- Simon R.H. James, author of London Film Location Guide

== See also ==
- James Simon (disambiguation)
