= Neues Museum =

Museum in Berlin, Germany

New Museum
- Neues Museum
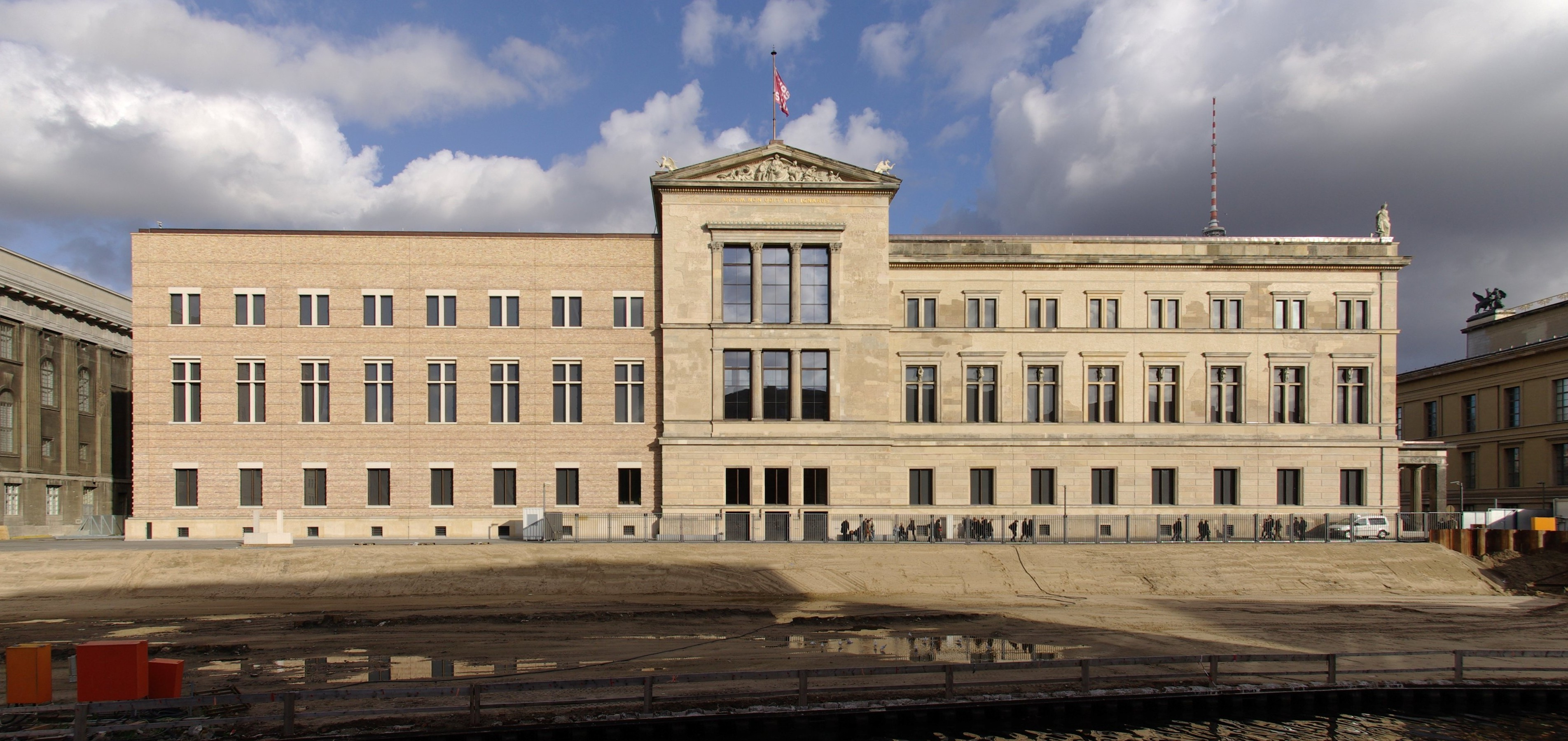
- Façade of the Neues Museum
- Established: 1855
- Location: Museum Island, Berlin
- Coordinates: 52°31′14″N 13°23′52″E
- Type: Archaeology museum
- Public transit access: U: Museumsinsel
- Website: www.smb.museum/en/museums-institutions/neues-museum/home/

UNESCO World Heritage Site
- Part of: Museumsinsel (Museum Island), Berlin
- Criteria: Cultural: ii, iv
- Reference: 896
- Inscription: 1999 (23rd Session)
- Area: 8.6 ha (21 acres)
- Buffer zone: 22.5 ha (56 acres)

The Neues Museum (German pronunciation: [ˈnɔʏəs muˈzeːʊm], New Museum) is a listed building on the Museum Island of Berlin. Built from 1843 to 1855 by order of King Frederick William IV of Prussia in Neoclassical and Renaissance Revival styles, it is considered as the major work of Friedrich August Stüler. After suffering damage in World War II and decay in East Germany, it was restored from 1999 to 2009 by David Chipperfield. Currently, the Neues Museum is home to the Egyptian Museum (Ägyptisches Museum), the Papyrus Museum (Berlin Papyrus Collection), the Museum for Pre- and Early History (Museum für Vor- und Frühgeschichte) and parts of the Antikensammlung. As part of the Museum Island complex, the museum was inscribed on the UNESCO World Heritage List in 1999 because of its outstanding architecture and testimony to the evolution of museums as a cultural phenomenon.

== Overview ==
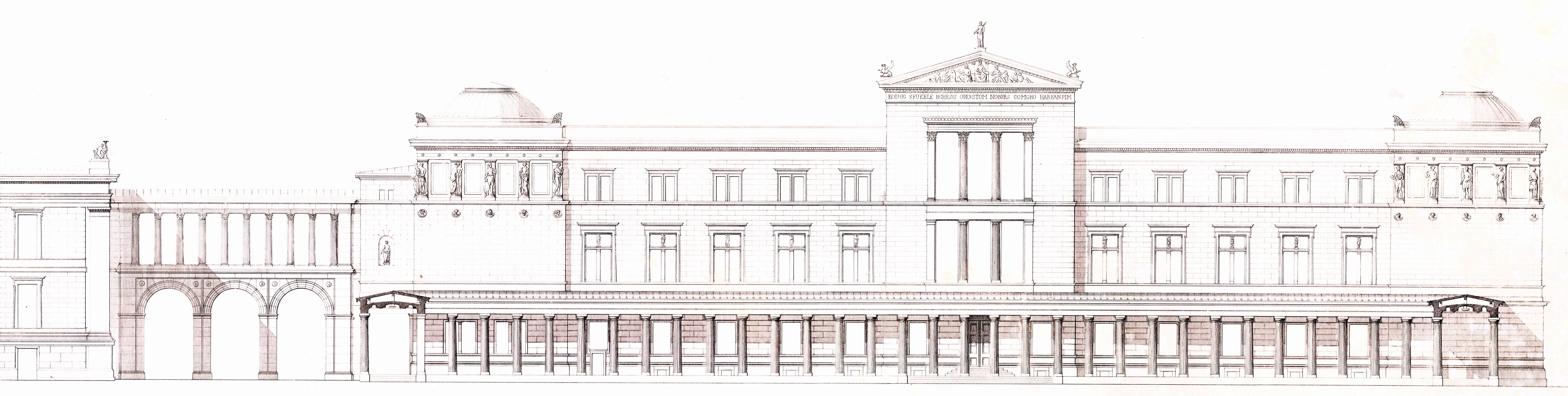
East façade of the Neues Museum with connection to the Altes Museum and the Colonnade, from Friedrich August Stüler, Das Neue Museum in Berlin, Riedel 1862

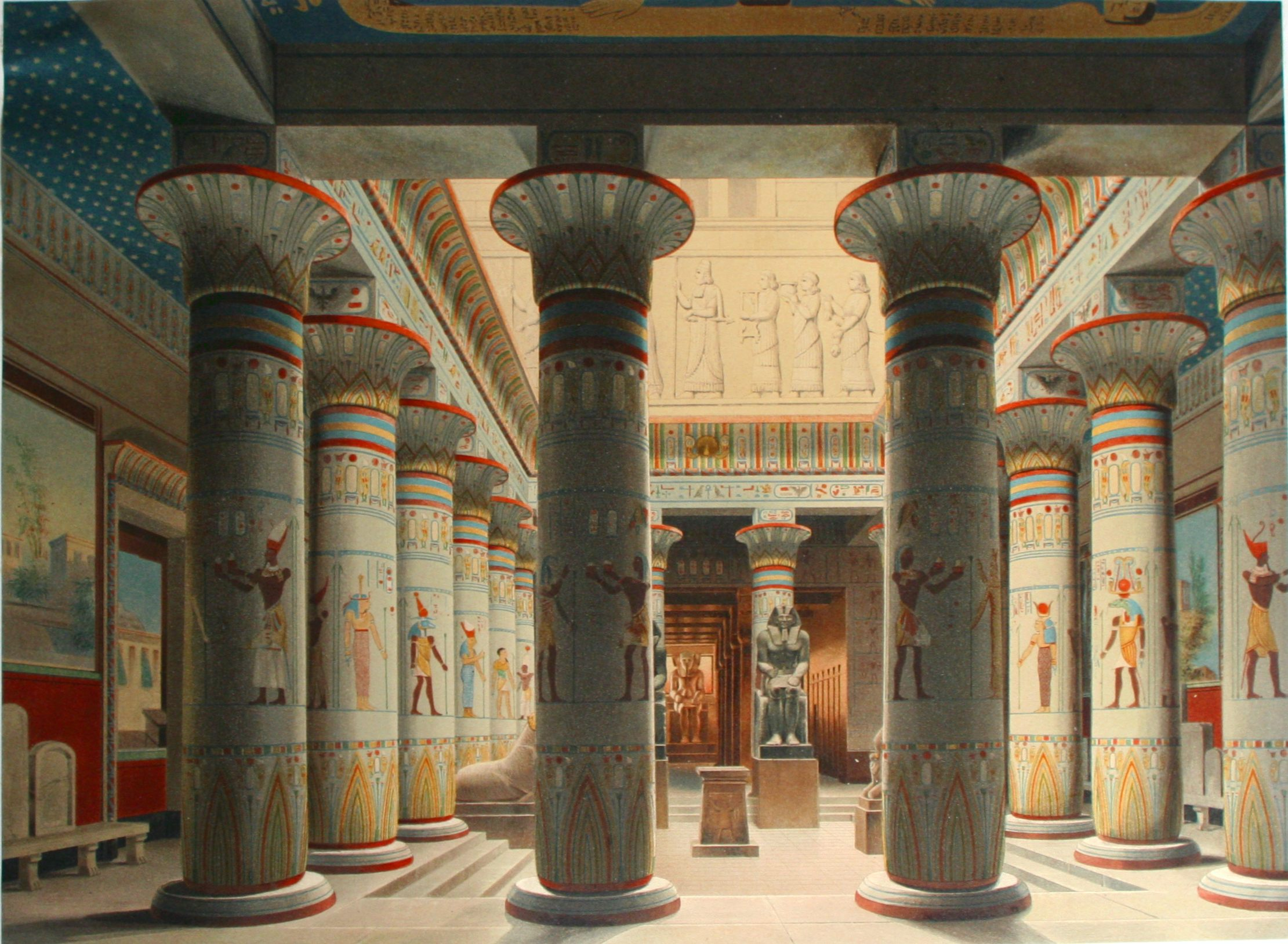
The Egyptian courtyard, from Friedrich August Stüler, Das Neue Museum in Berlin, Riedel 1862

The Neues Museum was the second museum to be built on Museum Island and was intended as an extension to house collections which could not be accommodated in the Altes Museum. Among these were collections of plaster casts, ancient Egyptian artifacts, the prehistoric and early historic collections (Museum der vaterländischen Altertümer), the ethnographic collection, and the collection of prints and drawings (Kupferstichkabinett). It is thus the "original source" of the collections in the Egyptian Museum of Berlin and the Ethnological Museum of Berlin.

Moreover, the Neues Museum is an important monument in the history of construction and technology. With its various iron constructions, it is the first monumental building of Prussia to consistently apply new techniques made possible by industrialization. As a further innovation, a steam engine was used for the first time in construction in Berlin. Among other things, it was used to ram pilings into the building ground. The soft, spongy soil around the River Spree means that buildings in the central area of Berlin require deep foundations.

It was built between 1843 and 1855 according to plans by Friedrich August Stüler, a student of Karl Friedrich Schinkel. The museum was closed at the beginning of World War II in 1939, and was heavily damaged during the bombing of Berlin. The rebuilding was overseen by the English architect David Chipperfield. The museum officially reopened in October 2009 and received a 2010 RIBA European Award and the 2011 European Union Prize for Contemporary Architecture.

Exhibits include the Egyptian and Prehistory and Early History collections, as it did before the war. The artifacts it houses include the iconic bust of the Egyptian queen Nefertiti.

Both as a part of the Museum Island complex and as an individual building, the museum testifies to the neoclassical architecture of museums in the 19th century. With its new industrialized building procedures and its use of iron construction, the museum plays an important role in the history of technology. Since the classical and ornate interiors of the Glyptothek and of the Alte Pinakothek in Munich were destroyed in World War II, the partly destroyed interior of the Neues Museum ranks among the last remaining examples of interior museum layout of this period in Germany.

== History ==
=== Construction ===
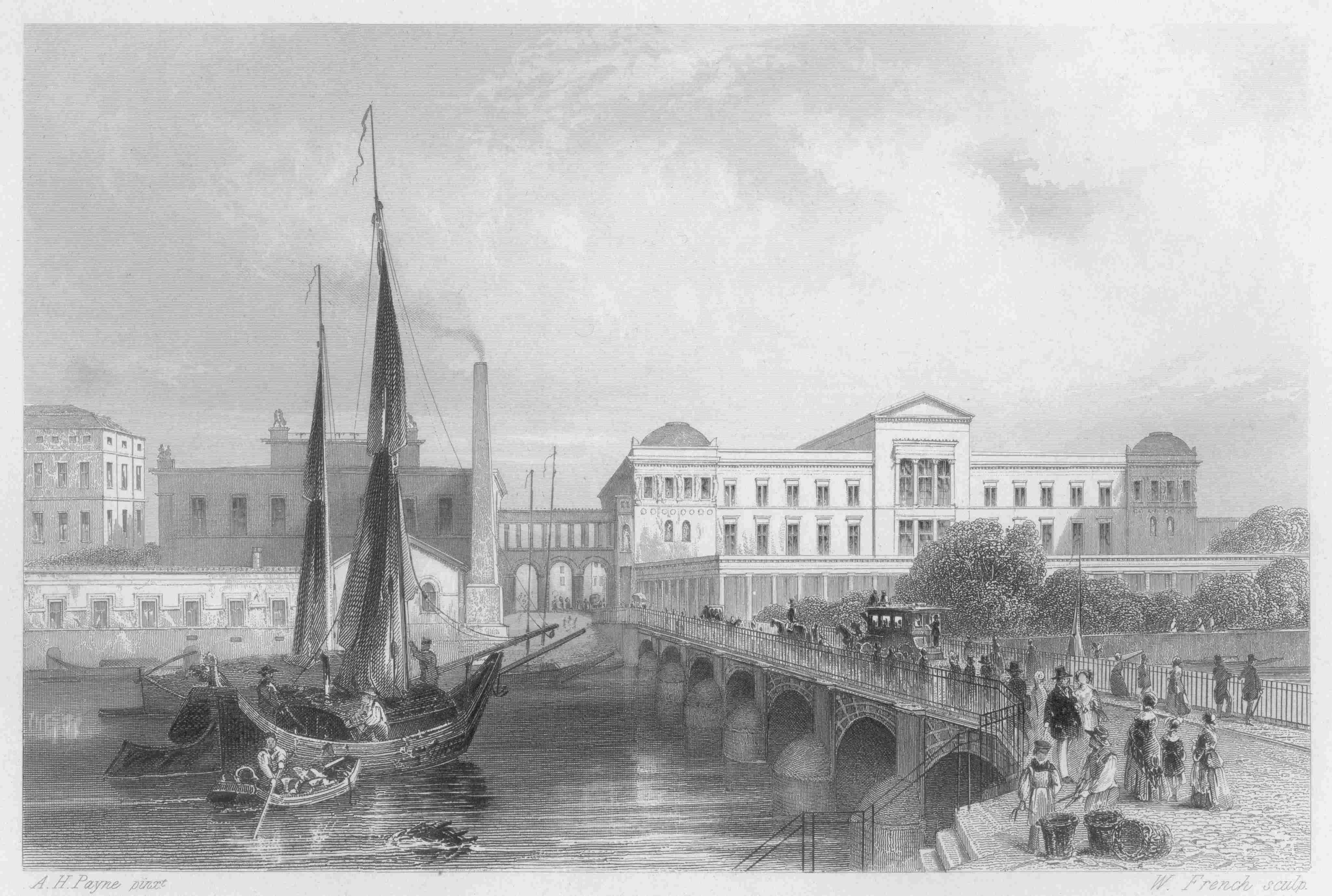
The Neues Museum and Friedrichsbrücke in 1850

Construction of the Neues Museum began on 19 June 1841, under the auspices of a committee established by Frederick William IV, which included the curator of the Royal Museums, Ignaz von Olfers, as well as Friedrich August Stüler. The king, with his cabinet, had already ordered that the construction project be assigned to Stüler on 8 March 1841. The poor quality of the ground at the building site became apparent when workers discovered deposits of diatomaceous earth just below the surface. Therefore, a pile structure was necessary under the whole building, consisting of 2344 wooden foundation piles between 6.9 and 18.2 meters (23 and 60 ft) long. To ram the piles in, a 5-horsepower (3.7 kW) steam engine was used, whose power could be increased if necessary to 10 hp (7.5 kW). It drove the pumps that drained the building site, the elevators, and the mortar mixing machines. The newsletter of the Berlin Architecture Association reported on the building site and the new technical devices.

On 6 April 1843 when the ceremony of laying the cornerstone took place, the foundations, including the cellars, were already built. Construction of the walls was completed at the end of 1843, so that by 1844, the cornice and roof of the museum were completed. In 1845, iron constructions, the construction of flat vaulted ceilings and brick-lining of the connecting gallery to the Altes Museum were completed. An auxiliary railway transported building materials from the street just west across the River Spree, Am Kupfergraben, to the steam engine-driven elevator. On the individual floors of the museum, rails were also used to transport construction materials. In 1846, the workers began work on the building's façade, apart from the sculptures in the pediments, and also started cleaning the interiors, building the marble stairway steps and began work on the flooring. This work had progressed well in 1847 and the costly interior fittings could begin. The March revolution of 1848 led to delays in the construction work, which was however not completely interrupted at any time. As soon as the respective areas were completed, the installation of the collection began, until the museum was finally opened in 1855 to the public, although work on parts of the interior decoration, in particular the wall frescos in the stairway, continued until 1866.

=== From opening to World War II ===
When the Neues Museum opened, there were the Egyptian, patriotic and ethnographic collections in the ground floor, while the collections of the plaster casts of Greek and Roman sculptures from antiquity and Byzantine, Romanesque, Gothic, Renaissance and Classic art works occupied the first floor. The collection of etchings and engravings and the so-called art chamber (Kunstkammer), a collection of architectural models, furniture, clay, pottery and glass containers, and church articles shared the second floor, along with smaller works of art from the Middle Ages and modern times. The Ethnology Museum (Völkerkundemuseum), founded in 1873, moved to its own building in 1886 on Königgrätzer Straße (today Stresemannstraße; this building was destroyed in World War II). Connected with this were the removal of the Ethnographic collection, the collection of the patriotic antiquities, and part of the "art chamber" collection. The newly founded Museum of Arts and Crafts (Kunstgewerbemuseum) took possession of the remaining nearly 7,000 objects of the "art chamber" in 1875, and also moved to its own building, the Martin Gropius Bau, in 1881. The areas thus freed in the ground floor housed the Egyptian collection again, while the areas in the first floor were occupied by the collection of etchings and engravings.

From 1883 to 1887, an additional mezzanine level, which is not visible from the exterior, was added to the Neues Museum. The collection of plaster casts, a centerpiece of collections at the time of the construction, grew during the course of the 19th century to become one of the most extensive and most comprehensive cast collections. However, because of a change in curatorial priorities in favour of original works of art, it was handed over between 1916 and 1920 (with the exception of the largest statues) to the Berlin University, where it was destroyed to a large extent during World War II.

In the halls of the first floor, the vase collection of the antique museum, as well as the papyrus collection of the Egyptian museum were installed. Changes in the ground floor, from 1919 to 1923, led for the first time to substantial changes in the original building. In the Greek courtyard, the apse was removed, the courtyard covered with a glass roof, and a new floor at the same height as the ground floor was added. Thus several rooms and cabinets for the display of the Amarna collection were created. In the adjacent areas of the ground floor, suspended ceilings were added to produce modern, neutral display rooms by covering the original decorations.

The museum was closed at the beginning of World War II in 1939. The destruction in the war followed these internal destructions of the original museum layout. In the bombardments on 23 November 1943, the central stairway and its frescos were burned, along with other great treasures of human history. In February 1945, Allied bombs destroyed the northwest wing as well as the connection to the Altes Museum and damaged the southwest wing as well as the south-east façade (risalit).

=== World War II to 2009 ===
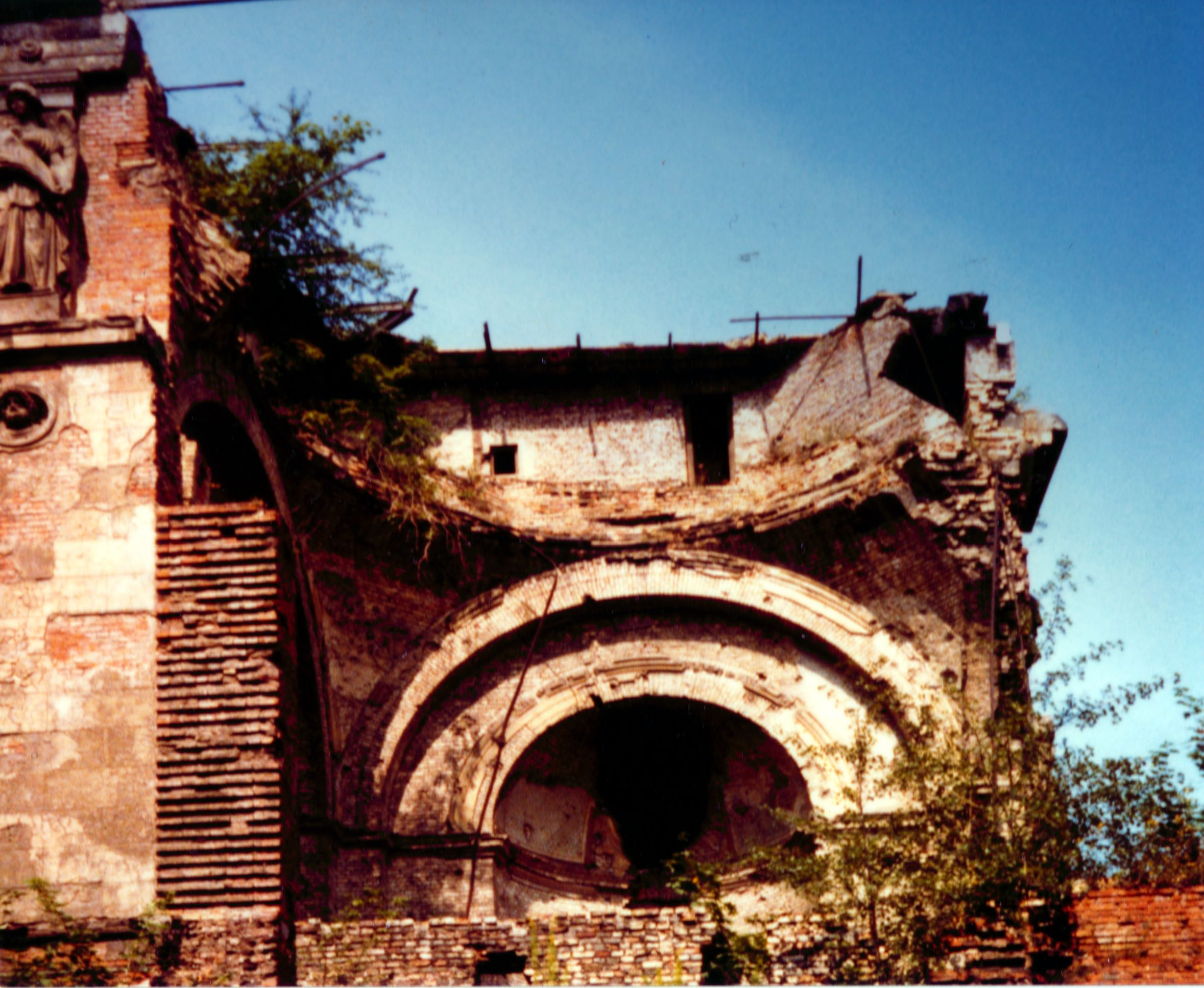
Ruins of the Neues Museum in 1984 (view of the room of the south cupola)

In the post-war period, the ruin of the Neues Museum in the Soviet-occupied part of the city was left decaying for a long period of time. Other museums on Museum Island used the least damaged areas of the building for storage. Reconstruction work was started in 1986 by the East German government, but it was halted after the fall of the Berlin Wall and German reunification. In the process historical parts of the building were lost. For instance, the last remnants of the Egyptian courtyard were eliminated.

In 1997, planning for the reconstruction project was resumed and English architect David Chipperfield was officially appointed for the project. Sections and fragments of the building were taken out and put in storage. In June 2003 the Federal Government Commissioner for Cultural and Media Affairs, Christina Weiss, said on the occasion of the ceremony for the commencement of reconstruction of the museum that the master plan had "nearly squared the circle: to emphasize the buildings as a historical inheritance, to logically direct the flow of the host of visitors, and to make ready... a modern infrastructure." In January 2006, Chipperfield handed over his completed Museum of Modern Literature to the German Literature Archive in Marbach am Neckar (Deutsches Literaturarchiv Marbach).

A new reception building for visitors to Museum Island, the "Cube", was also planned to be completed in 2009. The "Cube", which cost about €60 million, was under a planning freeze, which Chipperfield saw as endangering progress on the Neues Museum, according to ZDF, the Second German Television channel. In view of the total cost of the Museum Island master plan, estimated to be €1.5 billion, the controversy over the €60 million for the "Cube" appeared disproportionate not only to the architect. A March 2006 report on ZDF commented, "if the planning freeze is not lifted by the end of the year, the "Cube" cannot be completed in time.

=== Reopening in 2009 ===
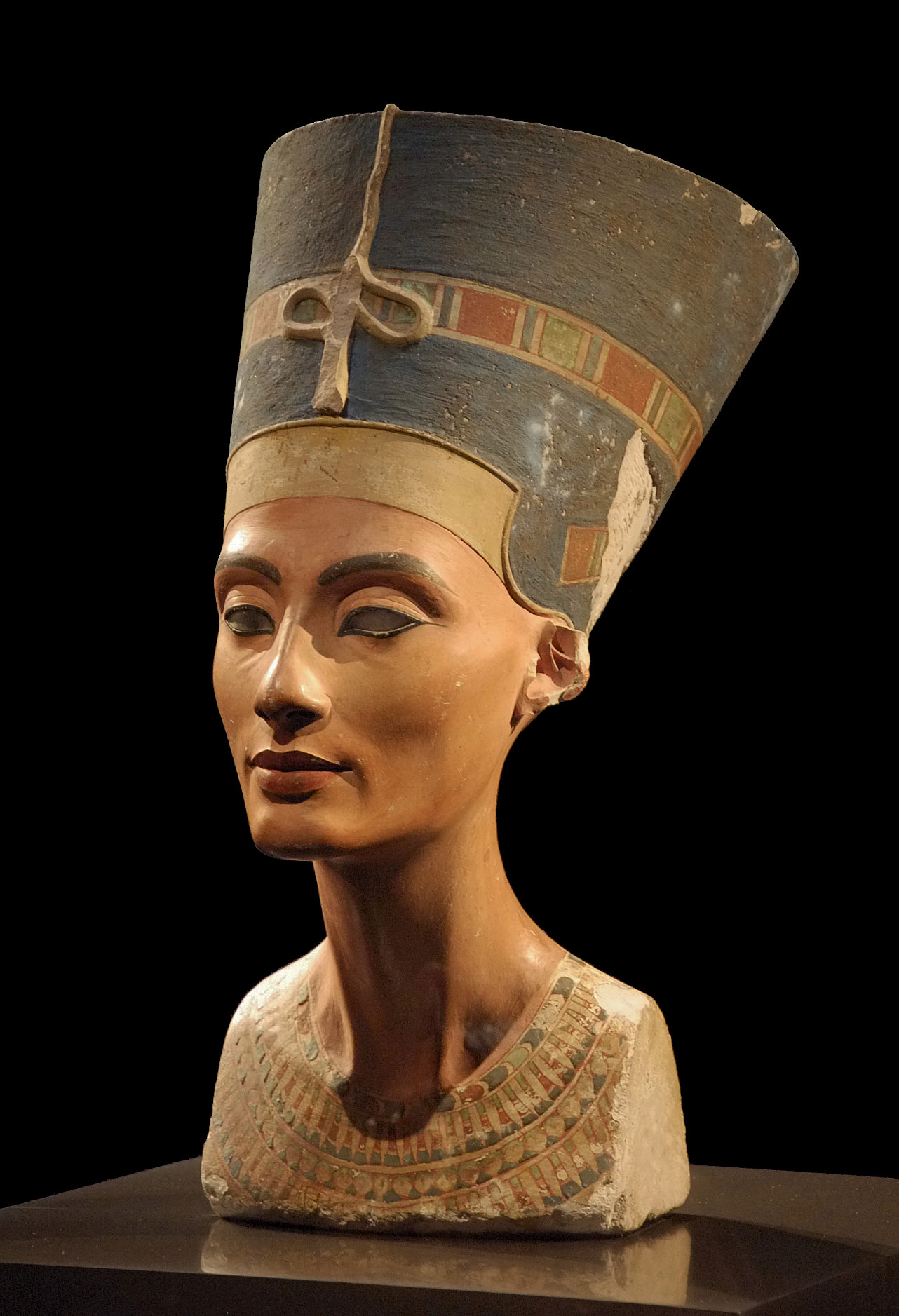
The bust of Nefertiti, attributed to Thutmose

After the consolidation of the foundations and walls, the Neues building was reconstructed. This work was done within the framework of the Masterplan for Berlin's Museum Island, with a cost of approximately €295 million for the Neues Museum. The northwest wing and the south-east façade, which were completely destroyed in the war, have been reconstructed according to Chipperfield's plan, in a manner close to their original layout in the museum building.

In March 2009, the museum briefly reopened to the public with its empty building; artifacts had not been installed at that time. On 16 October 2009, the museum officially reopened. At the reopening ceremony, the Chancellor of Germany Angela Merkel described Chipperfield's work as "impressive and extraordinary" and the museum as "one of the most important museum buildings in European cultural history". However, Chipperfield's construction design has been a subject of debate by those who preferred a more traditional reconstruction of Friedrich August Stüler's original 19th-century design. A group called the Society of Ancient Berlin requested UNESCO in 2008 to put the Museum Island on the list of World Heritage Sites that are at danger of losing their status, seeing Chipperfield's architectural concept involving complete reconstructions as a form of cultural destruction. By contrast, the design was acknowledged in 2011 when David Chipperfield Architects in collaboration with Julian Harrap were awarded the European Union Prize for Contemporary Architecture.

The museum houses the Egyptian museum and papyrus collection with its famous bust of Queen Nefertiti and other works of art from the time of the king Akhenaten. Portions of another major collection, artifacts from the Stone Age and later prehistoric eras from the Museum of Pre- and Early History, are on display. Thus the collections of two Berlin museums have returned to their place of origin.

The museum becomes part of the archaeological promenade: an underground passageway connecting all the buildings on the Museum Island, with the exception of the Alte Nationalgalerie. This includes the Neues Museum as an important part of the historical architectural context of the Museum Island. The building has been said to represent a lasting monument in stone for its first architect, Friedrich August Stüler, who wished that "the whole building should form a centre for the highest mental interests of the people, the likes of which no other capital would likely be able to exhibit."

== Building ==
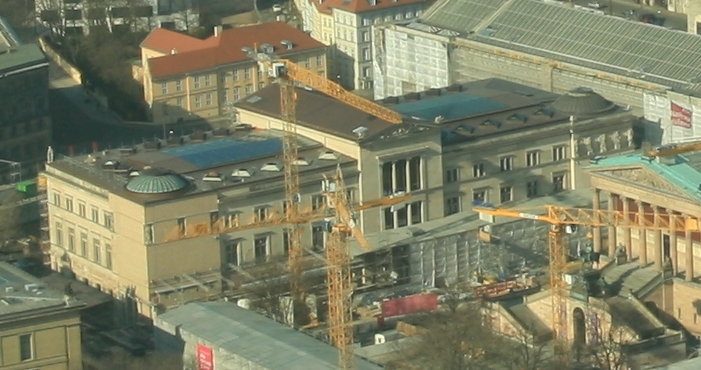
Neues Museum in 2008

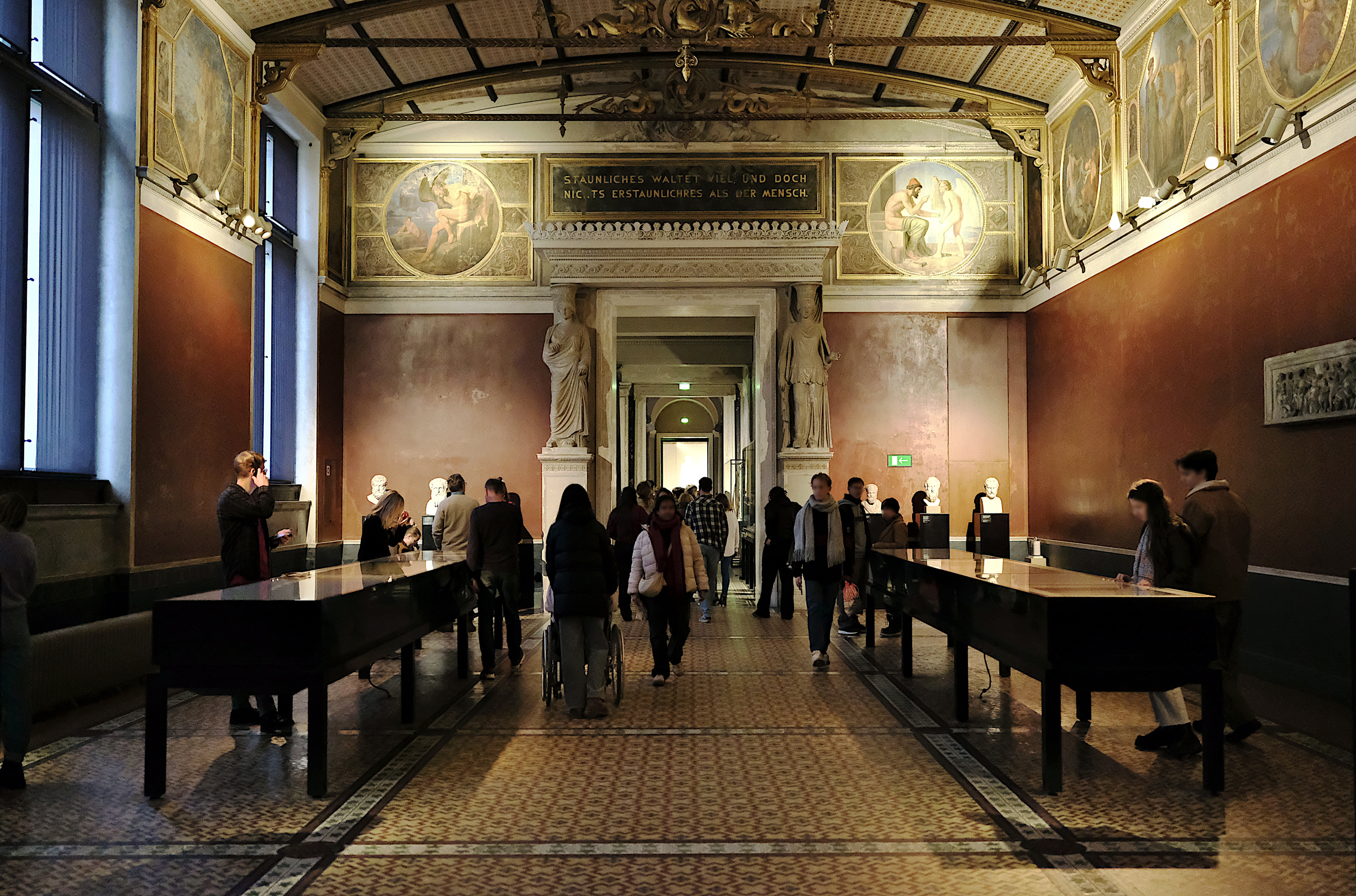
A room in 2024

As originally built (see map below), the Neues Museum was nearly rectangular, with the long axis of the building (105 m or 344 ft) oriented north to south, parallel to Am Kupfergraben (the street to the west, across the River Spree), and a width of 40 meters (130 ft). The building is nearly perpendicular to the Altes Museum, with the Bodestraße between them. The bridge connecting the two museums (destroyed during World War II) was 6.9 m (23 ft) wide, 24.5 m (80 ft) long, and supported by three arches. The main stairway was located in the center of the building, which was the highest section (31 m or 102 ft tall).

The three main wings surround two interior courtyards, the Greek courtyard and the Egyptian courtyard. The northern Egyptian courtyard was covered with a glass ceiling from the beginning, but the southern Greek courtyard was first covered with a glass ceiling between 1919 and 1923.

=== 2009 ===
The James Simon Gallery, located on Museum Island, provides access to an area near the Neues Museum that was previously inaccessible. The architectural dialogue between the two buildings is now evident, representing the culmination of a process that began when the Neues Museum reopened in 2009. The contemporary architectural plan for the James Simon Galerie was also designed by David Chipperfield.

=== General map ===
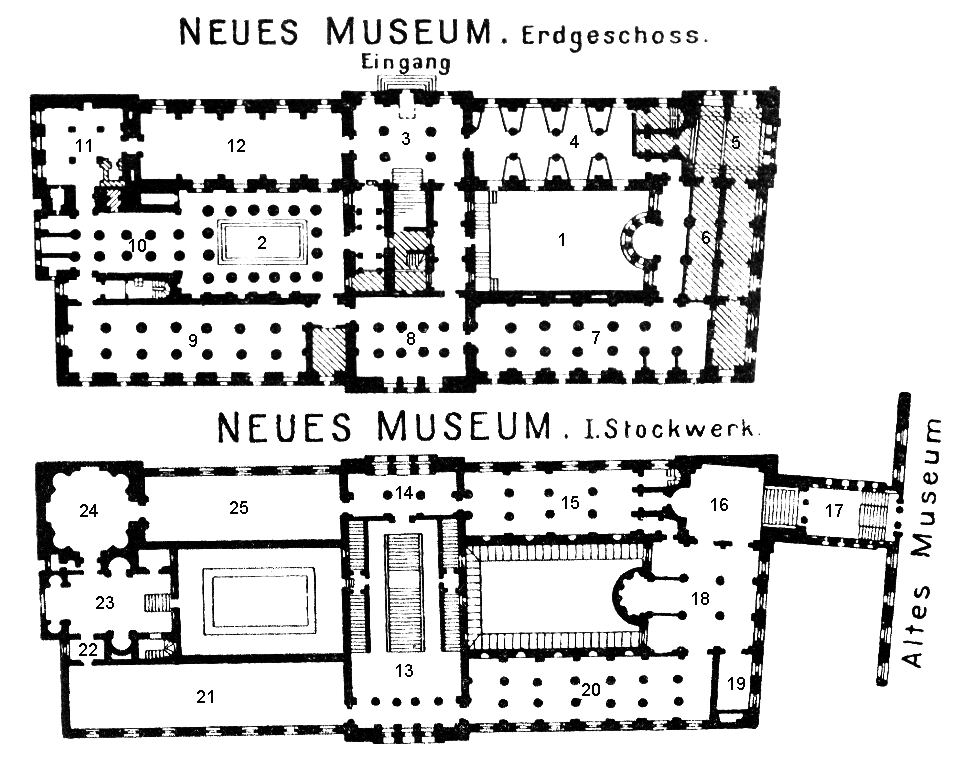

Ground Floor (Erdgeschoss)

1) Greek Courtyard
2) Egyptian Courtyard
3) Main Vestibule
4) Patriotic Room
5) South Vestibule
6) Vaulted Room
7) Ethnographic Room
8) Room behind the stairs
9) Historical Room
10) Hypostyle
11) Egyptian Tombs Room
12) Mythological Room

Upper Floor (1. Stockwerk)

13) Main Stairs
14 ) Bacchus Room
15) Roman Room
16) South Cupola Room
17) Connection to Altes Museum
18) Room of the Middle Ages
19) Bernward Room
20) Modern Room
21) Greek Room
22) Cabinet of Laocoön
23) Apollo Room
24) North Cupola Room
25) Nubian Room

== See also ==
- List of art museums
- List of museums in Berlin
- List of museums in Germany
- Medinet Madi library

== Bibliography ==
- Uffelen, Chris van (2011). Contemporary Museums. Braun Pub Ag. ISBN 978-3-03768-067-4.
