= James Simmons =

James Simmons may refer to:

- James Simmons (poet) (1933–2001), Irish poet, literary critic and songwriter
- James Simmons (1741–1807), Canterbury newspaper proprietor, banker, mill owner, mayor and M.P.
- James A. Simmons (scientist), American researcher in bat echolocation
- James Aubrey Simmons (1897–1979), Canadian politician and notary
- James B. Simmons (1825–1905), recording secretary American Baptist Home Mission Society, 1867–1874
- James E. Simmons Jr., American lawyer and judge in Southern California
- James F. Simmons (1795–1864), United States Senator from Rhode Island
- James S. Simmons (New York politician) (1861–1935), United States Representative from New York
- James S. Simmons (Mississippi politician) (1847–?), member of the Mississippi House of Representatives
- Jim Simmons (footballer) (1889–1972), English footballer who played for Sheffield United
- James M. Simmons (born 1942), musician and President of Lamar University in Beaumont, Texas
- James Simmons (actor), in films such as Henry V
- Jim Simmons (American football) (1903–1977), American football player

== See also ==
- James Simons (disambiguation)
- James B. Simmons House
