= Fairfield Mirror =

Student newspaper of Fairfield University in Fairfield, Connecticut

The Fairfield Mirror
- Type: Student newspaper
- Format: Berliner
- School: Fairfield University
- Owner(s): The Fairfield Mirror, Inc.
- Editor: Sophia Cossitt-Levy
- Founded: 1977; 49 years ago
- Headquarters: Box AA 1073 North Benson Road; BCC Room 104; Fairfield, CT 06824
- Circulation: 4,700
- Website: fairfieldmirror.com

The Fairfield Mirror (or The Mirror) is the student newspaper of Fairfield University in Fairfield, Connecticut. It is a student-run publication that publishes weekly on Wednesdays during the academic year with additional issues during commencement and orientation. The Mirror staff has won numerous Excellence in Journalism Awards from the Connecticut Society of Professional Journalists.

== History ==
The students of Fairfield University founded and published the first edition of The Mirror in 1977. The newspaper was founded after the merging of two prior publications: one produced under the supervision of the university (The Voice), and one published independently (The Free Press and Review).

The genesis of the change to The Mirror, was Ned Barnett, who as Editor-in-Chief of The Voice, was one of the driving forces to create an independent newspaper. In addition, the university was seeking to limit its liability from the publication of a student-run media outlet.

The Mirror's second Editor-in-Chief was Robert M. "Doc" Dougherty, who was responsible for the editorial content, and Frank Godfrey, the business manager, who was responsible for the paper's finances and operations as an independent, incorporated entity. The paper was printed by Stratford Printing, and delivered weekly to campus dorms, classroom buildings, and the Campus Center.

The online edition was founded in 2000, and it was the first partner to have a signed contract with the now ubiquitous College Publisher network of online student newspapers.

The Mirror incorporated full-process color in the print edition for the first time in the early 2000s.

Dr. James Simon had been the adviser of The Mirror since 1998, but the role was given to associate English professor Tommy Xie in spring 2011 before being passed on to professor Matt Tullis in fall 2018. The role returned to Tommy Xie in fall 2022.

=== 2009 He Said/She Said controversy ===
In 2009 a controversy erupted over the recurring humorous columns He Said/She Said, which typically offer a male and female perspective on some issue. The September 30, 2009, issue's columns focused on best practices for conducting one-night stands and the walk of shame at Fairfield. The columns (especially the "He Said" column by student Chris Surette) resulted in immediate controversy among students and administrators. There was a sit-in protest of students at The Mirror's campus offices, and public rebukes from the university president and from dean of students Thomas Pellegrino. Pellegrino informed The Mirror that they had violated the ethical guidelines in the paper's funding agreement with the university, and that this funding agreement was "null and void". Later, a group of students sought disciplinary action against The Mirror claiming the offensive content in the "He Said" column had violated the school's harassment policy.

- Chris Surette's "He Said" column

In its first issue of 2010 The Mirror announced that He Said/She Said column would be discontinued.

=== Excellence in Journalism Awards ===
- In 2007, six Mirror staff writers won ten collegiate journalism awards from the Connecticut Society of Professional Journalists including four first place awards for editorial writing, general column writing, sport story writing and sports photography.
- In 2008, seven Mirror staff writers won nine collegiate journalism awards from the Connecticut Society of Professional Journalists including four first place awards for editorial writing, general column writing, sport story writing and sports photography.
- In 2009, eight Mirror staff writers won fourteen collegiate journalism awards from the Connecticut Society of Professional Journalists including four first place awards for editorial column, feature photo, news photo, sport story.
- In 2017, four Mirror staff writers won five collegiate journalism awards from the Connecticut Society of Professional Journalists including four first place awards for front page layout, non-front page layout and one second for news story.
- In 2026, Mirror staff writers won four collegiate journalism Apple Awards from the College Media Association including first place awards for opinion column and multimedia package, second place for best social media coverage of a single event, and honorable mention for crisis coverage.

== Operations ==
The Mirror is distributed at Fairfield University on Wednesdays during the fall and spring semesters. While previously the print circulation consisted of 2,500 copies, as of fall 2018, print was reduced to 1,000 copies under the supervision of the editorial board consisting of Alicia Phaneuf, Cara Lee, and Deanna Carbone. However, thousands of alumni, parents, and other members of the university community read the Web edition on a regular basis. The circulation was then further reduced to 750 print copies, and then to 700 print copies.

Since 2005, The Mirror has been printed weekly by Trumbull Printing in Trumbull, Conn. but began printing with the Valley Publishing Company in 2021.

The Mirror is an affiliate of UWIRE, which distributes and promotes its content to their network.
