= Friedrichs Bridge =

Bridge in Berlin, Germany

Friedrichs Bridge Friedrichsbrücke
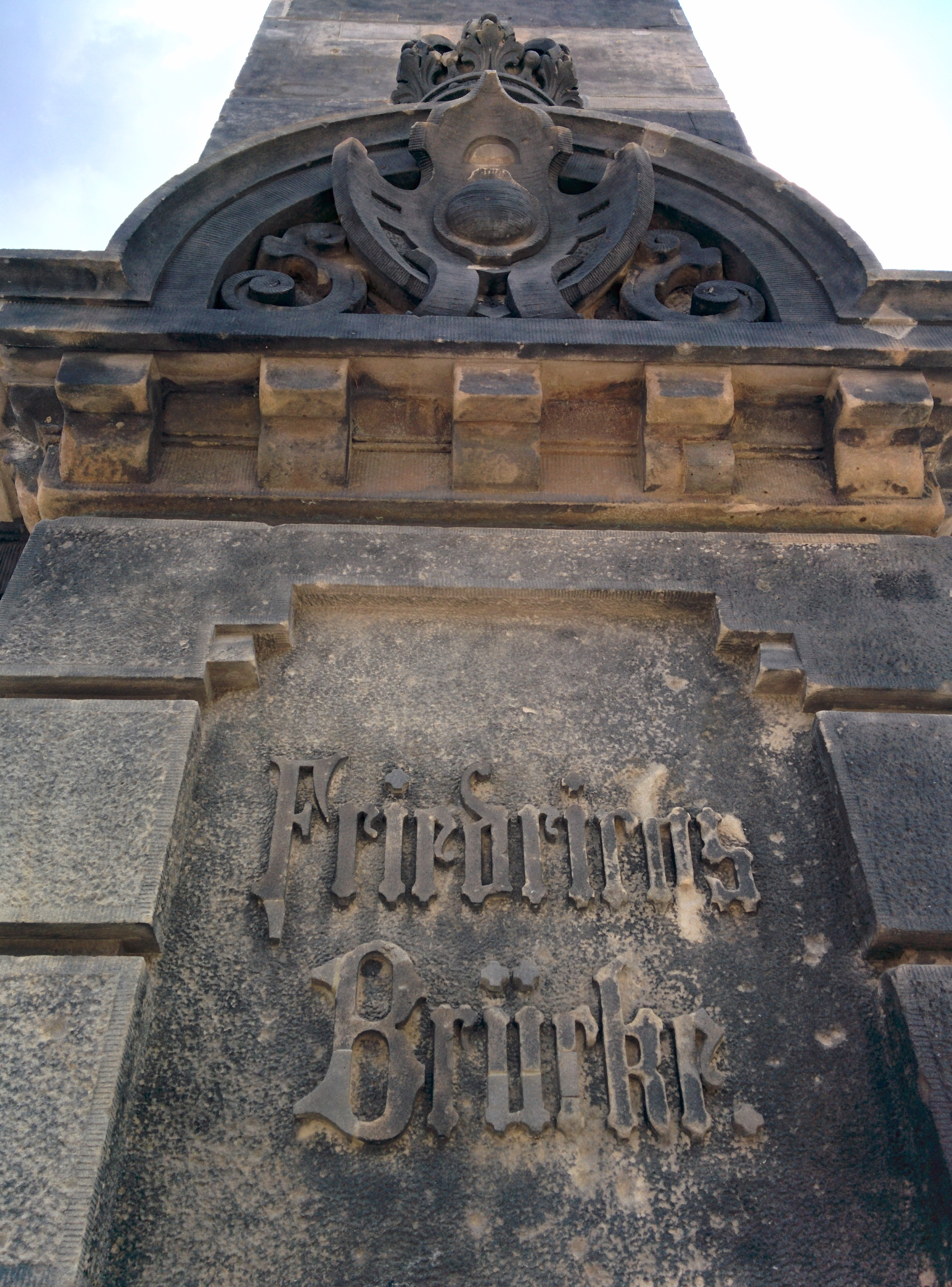
- A pylon inscribed with the bridge name.
- Coordinates: 52°31′14″N 13°24′1.4″E
- Crosses: Spree
- Locale: Berlin
- Begins: Museum Island
- Ends: Mitte

History
- Opened: 1703

Friedrichs Bridge (German: Friedrichsbrücke) is a bridge in Berlin, one of several crossing the Spree between Museum Island and the mainland portion of Mitte. It connects Anna-Louisa-Karsch-Straße with Bodestraße. Since its creation in 1703, the bridge has been repeatedly renovated. It is considered a protected monument.

== Timeline ==
Here is a brief historical overview of the bridge:

- 1703: Construction of a wooden bridge known as the Great Bridge to Pomeranze
- 1769: Construction of a vaulted brick bridge with a flap in the middle
- 1792: Renamed Friedrich's Bridge after King Frederick the Great of Prussia
- 1823: Replacement of vault and bridge flap by cast iron Tudor arches
- 1873–1875: Bridge widened from 9.9 metres (32 ft) to 16 metres (52 ft) and redesigned as a six-span bridge with stone pillars and cast iron sheets
- 1893–1894: Bridge completely rebuilt to achieve higher headroom required by shipping. Obelisks added at bridge ends; widened to 27 metres (89 ft)
- 1945: Blasted by the Wehrmacht
- 1950–1951: Construction of temporary wooden bridge
- 1981: Construction of a 12.5 metres (41 ft) prestressed concrete frame bridge as footbridge without river piers spanning 56.5 metres (185 ft)
- 2012–2014: Reconstruction of the bridge on the historical width of 27 metres (89 ft)
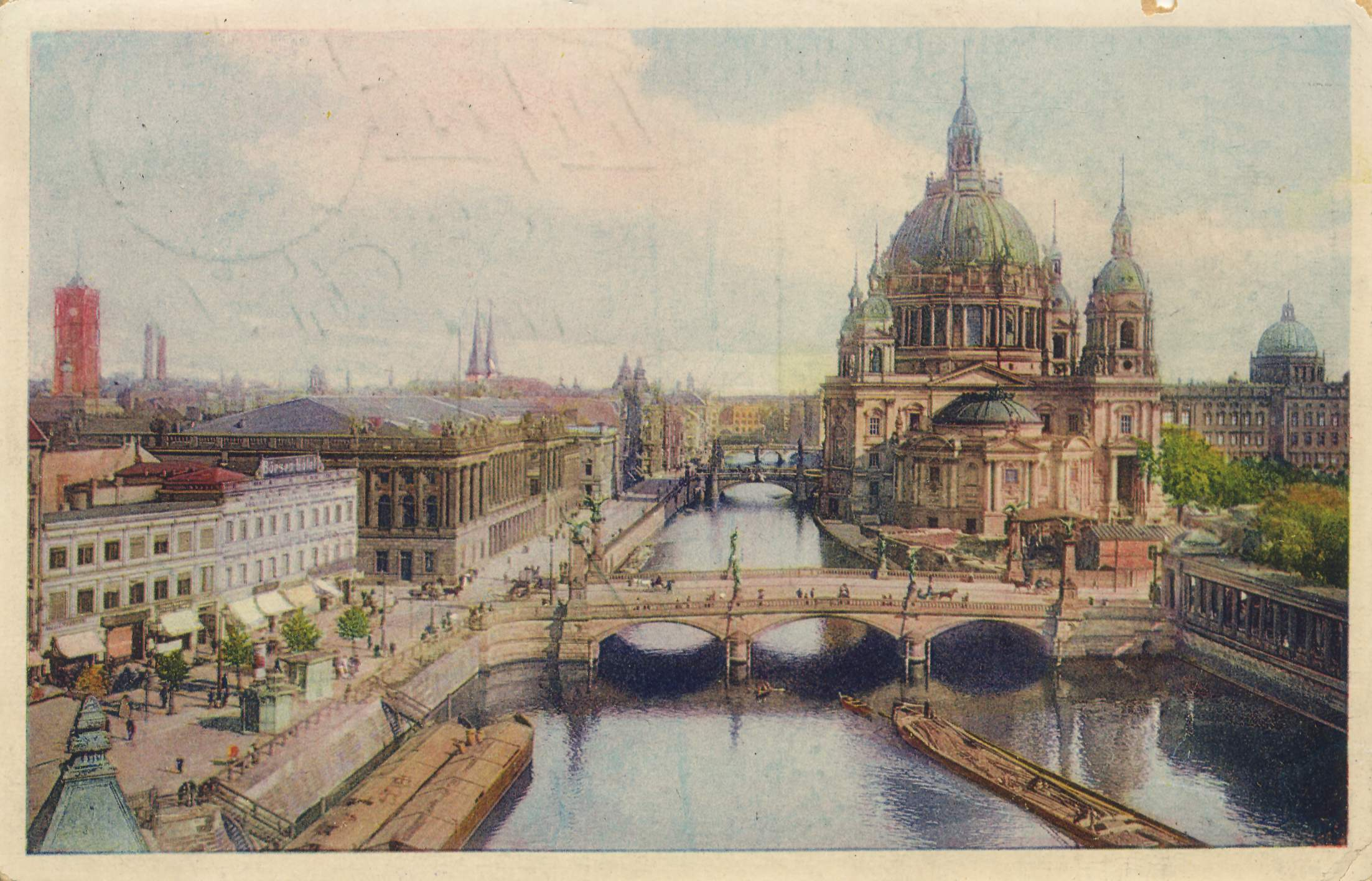
The bridge with Berlin Cathedral and Berlin Palace in c. 1907

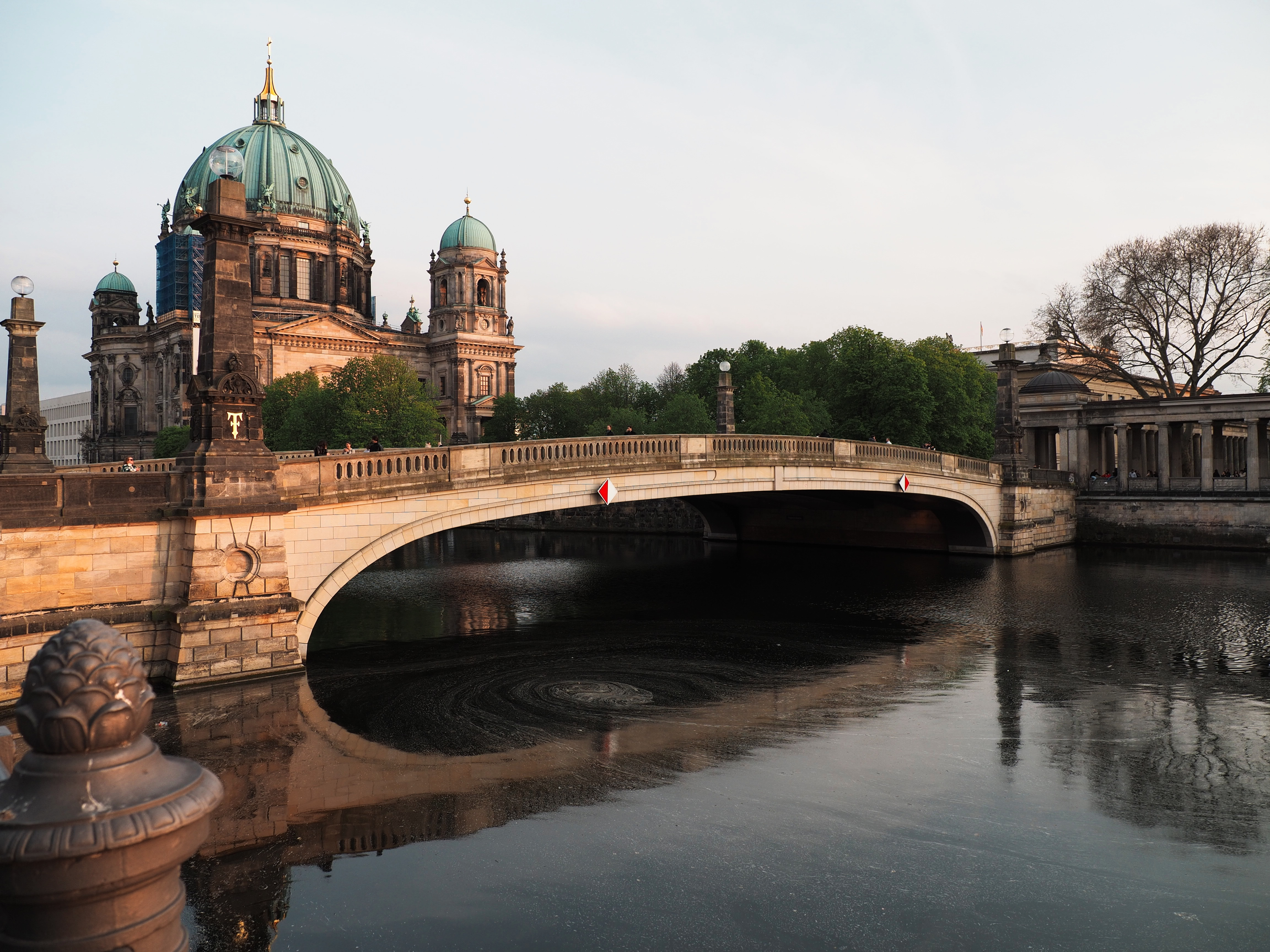
The bridge with Berlin Cathedral in 2021

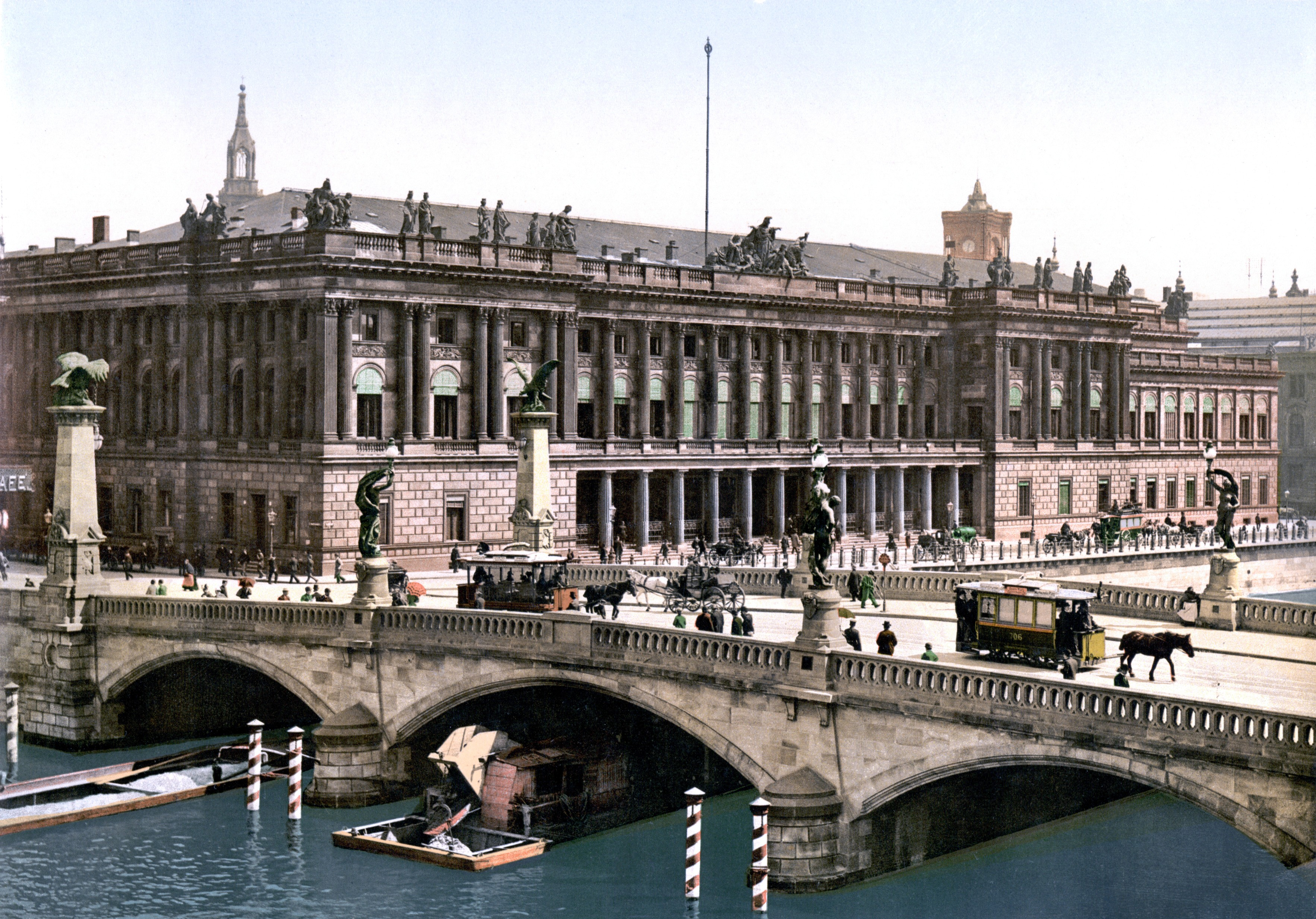
The bridge with Börse Berlin in c. 1900

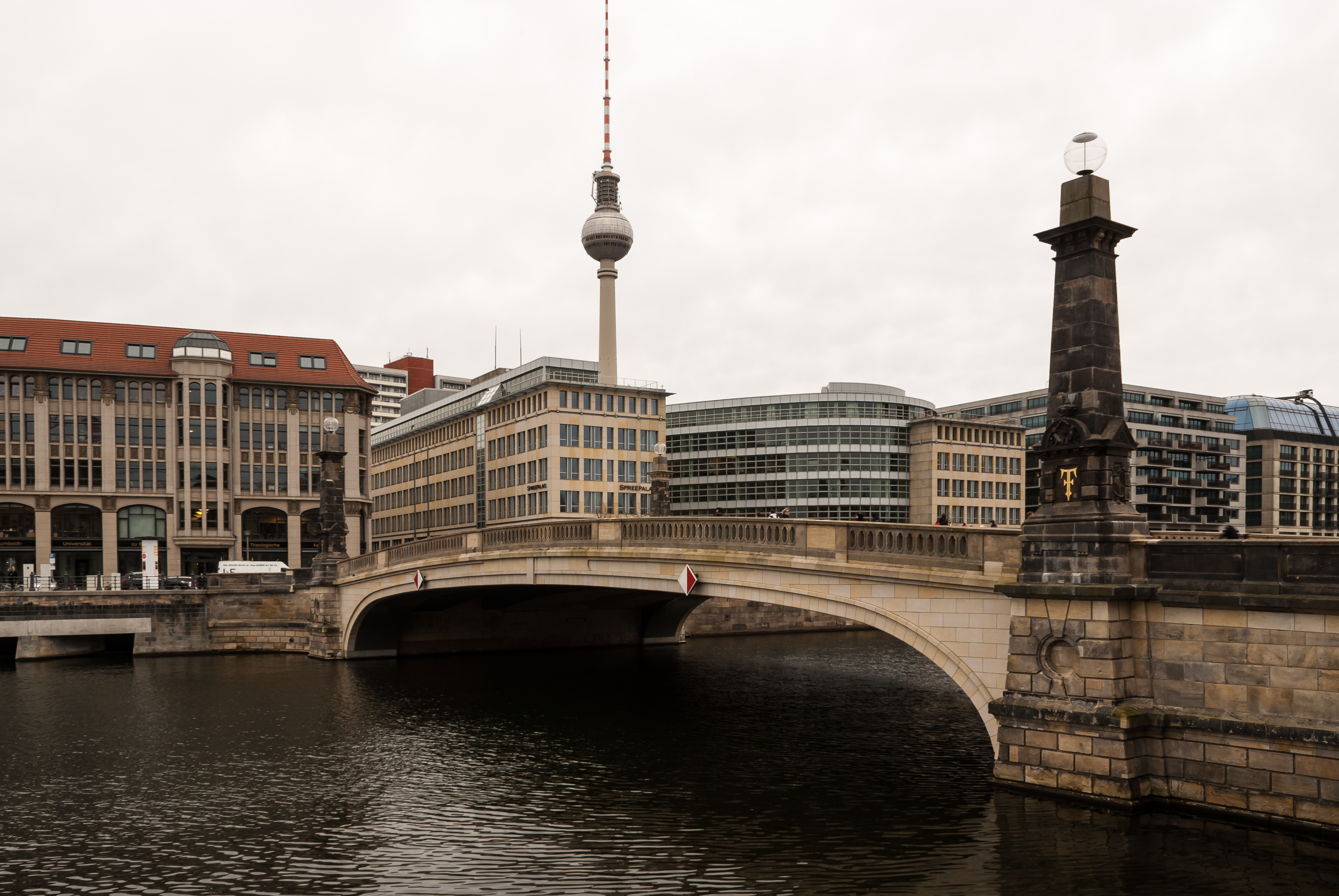
Similar perspective in 2016

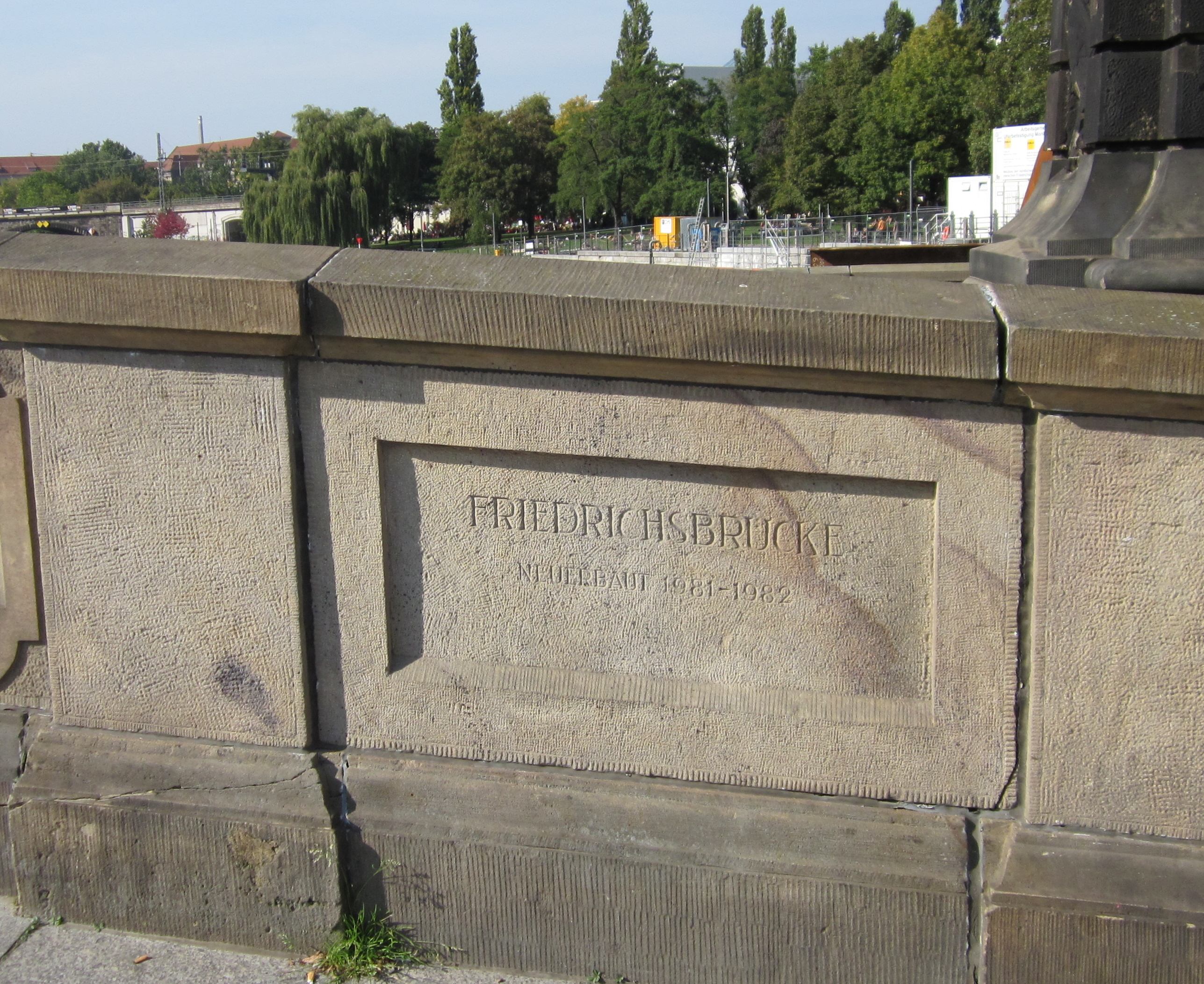
Inscription noting the new build of 1981–2
