= Jim Simons (disambiguation) =

Jim Simons (1938–2024) was an American mathematician and hedge fund manager.

Jim, Jimmy, or James Simons may also refer to:

- James Simons Sr. (1813–1879), who served as Speaker of the South Carolina House of Representatives
- James Simons Jr. (1839–1919), who served as Speaker of the South Carolina House of Representatives
- Jim Simons (golfer) (1950–2005), American golfer
- Jimmy Simons (born 1970), Dutch footballer
- Jimmy Simons, co-winner of 2001 Primetime Emmy Award for Outstanding Comedy Series

== See also ==
- James Simmons (disambiguation)
- James Simon (disambiguation)
