= James Simon Gallery =

Visitor center and art museum in Berlin

Coordinates: 52°31′14″N 13°23′52″E

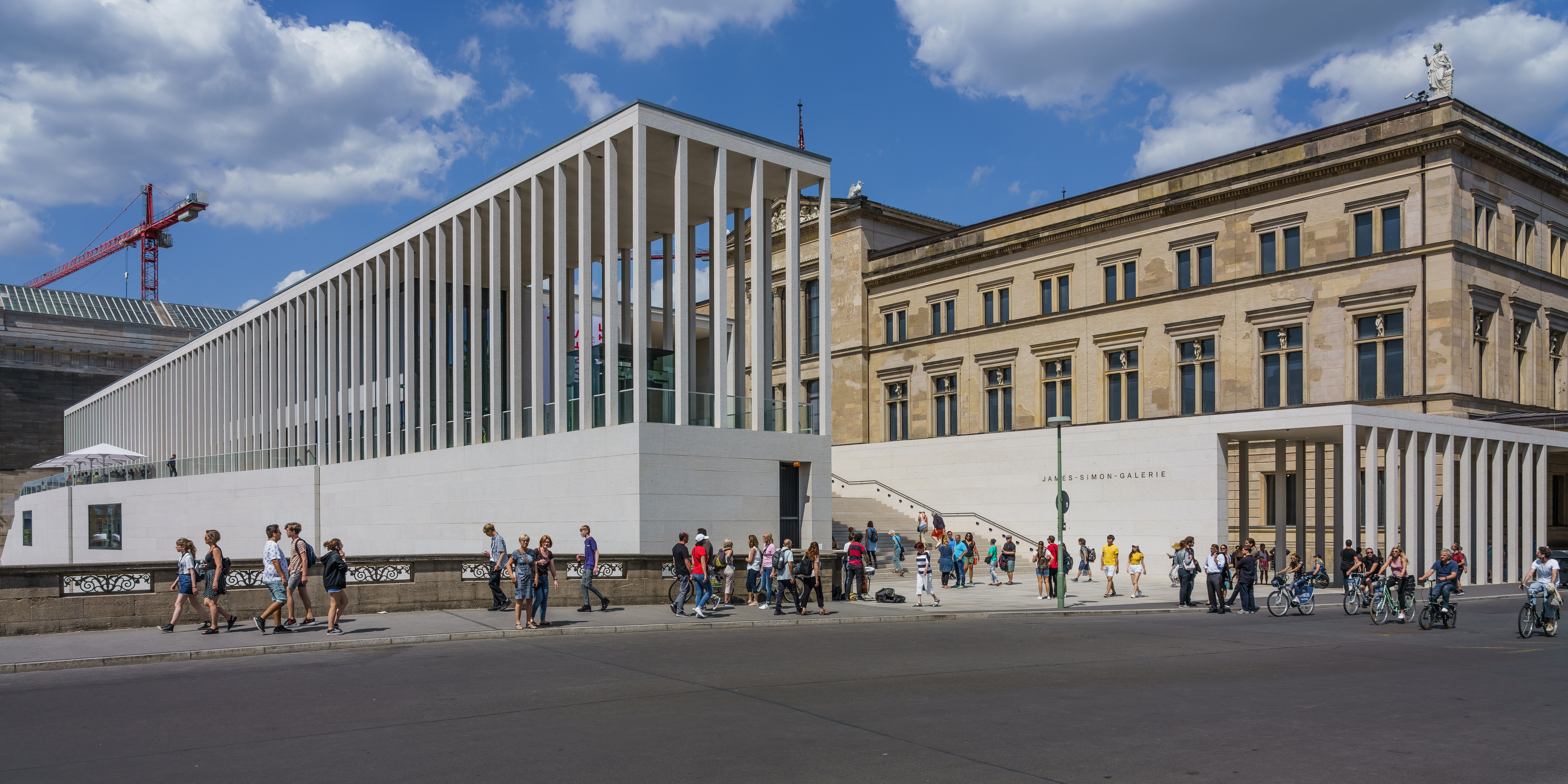
The entrance of the James Simon Gallery from Museum Island, pictured in 2019

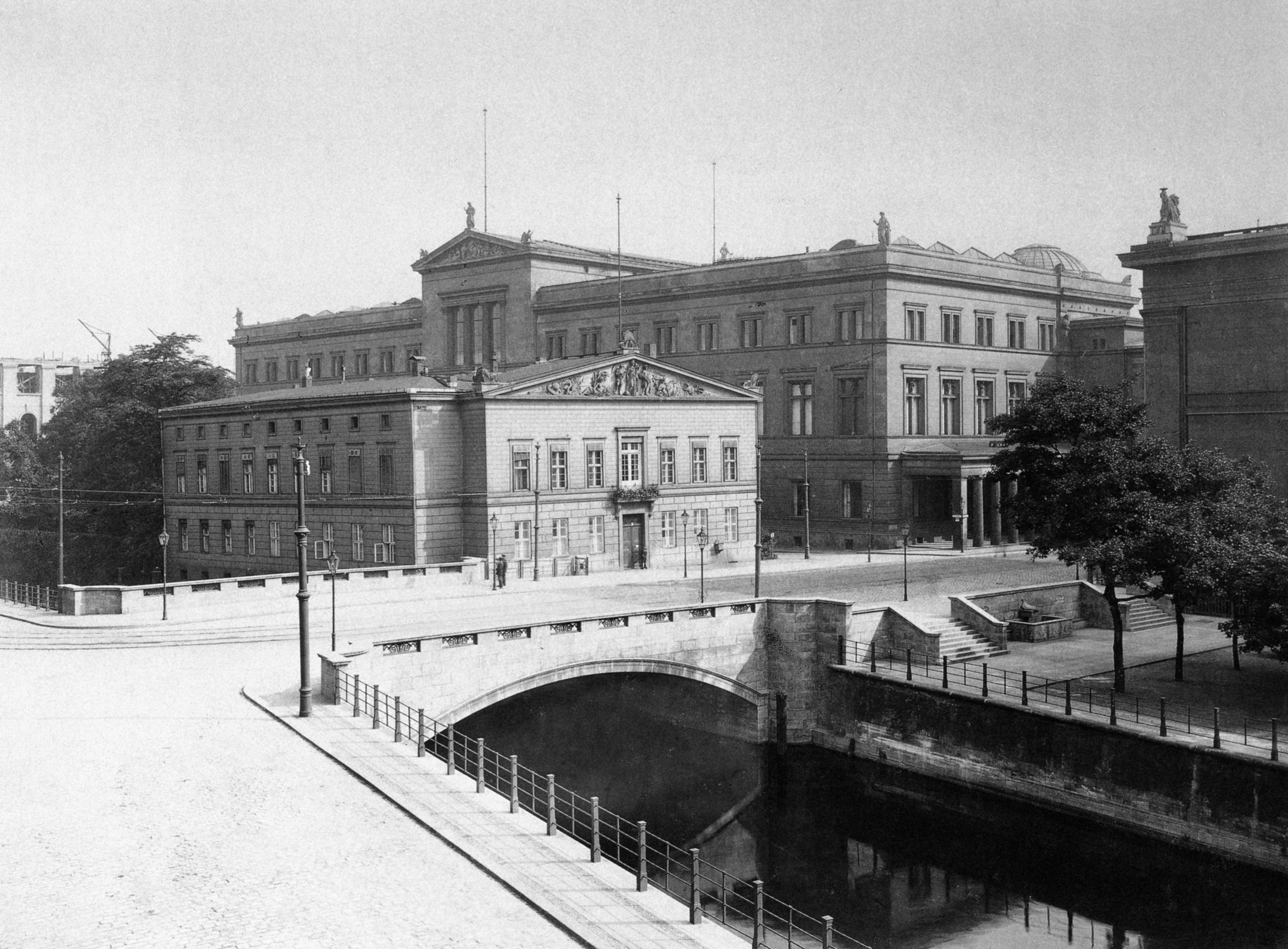
Packhof, 1916

The James Simon Gallery (German: James-Simon-Galerie) is an art gallery located between the reconstructed Neues Museum and the Kupfergraben arm of the Spree river on Museum Island in Berlin, Germany. It was designed by architect David Chipperfield and opened in 2019. As the sixth building on Museum Island, the gallery has a prominent position at the site of the former Packhof designed by Karl Friedrich Schinkel, which was demolished in 1938, and its design is inspired by the construction history of Museum Island.

The gallery is named in honour of the art patron Henri James Simon (1851–1932) who brought worldwide fame to the Berlin State Museums with his lavish donations, including important artwork and artifacts. The choice of a prolific Jewish donor as the gallery's namesake meant to recognize other Jewish donors whose names were removed from German museums during the Third Reich.

== History ==
Chipperfield's first designs for the James Simon Gallery featured plain cubes with a hull of satin glass and steel, causing various protests. In 2004, an official panel recommended to Parliament that the government abandon plans for the entrance building, which led to an extensive revision in 2007. The design of the reception building consisted of a stone basement, framed by a modern continuation of Friedrich August Stüler's colonnades at the Alte Nationalgalerie.

Originally planned at a cost of $94 million, the total cost of the project grew to $157 million; flaws in the foundation, which was built by divers due to the building's location on the Kupfergraben canal, necessitated two years of reconstruction. The gallery was ceremonially opened to the public on July 13, 2019, and saw 26,000 visitors on its opening day.

== Design ==
Similar in function to the Louvre Pyramid, the James Simon Gallery is designed to receive the visitors for the island, offer them orientation, and direct them to the exhibits featured on the main circuit. A broad staircase leads up in three flights to an elevated plateau with a line of 70 white concrete columns that stand almost nine metres high but are less than 30 centimetres thick. The building provides a 300-seat auditorium, with concrete walls cast in pleated acoustic folds; a media centre; a 600-square metre space for temporary exhibitions; a bookstore; shops; cafés and restaurants for all of Museum Island. Reviews of the James Simon Gallery in The Guardian and Architectural Digest praised the building, but noted similarities in the design of its colonnade to constructions at the Nazi Party Rally Grounds in Nuremberg designed by Albert Speer.
