= James Simon (sculptor) =

American sculptor and mosaic artist

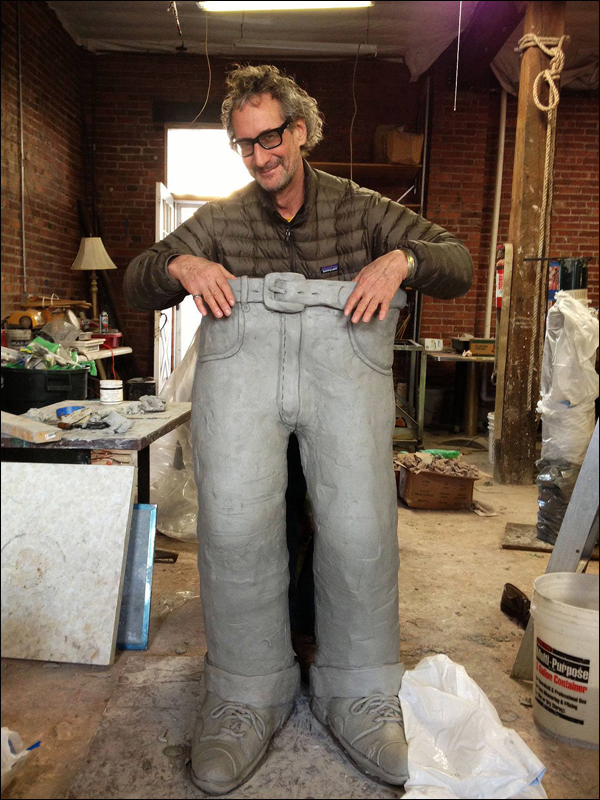
- Born: Pittsburgh, Pennsylvania, U.S.
- Known for: Sculpture, Mosaic, Installation Art, Public Art
- Awards: Artists & Cities Award, Pittsburgh, PA

James Simon is an American sculptor and mosaic artist based in Pittsburgh, PA. He is known for his large-scale public art projects-with compositions that celebrate life and diverse cultures.

== Early life ==
James Simon grew up in the Stanton Heights neighborhood of Pittsburgh, Pennsylvania. He won several national awards for his ceramic talents while attending Peabody High School, where he graduated from in 1972. He felt pulled to see the world and immediately hit the road -mostly hitchhiking and freight train jumping around the US and Canada. He learned carpentry and stained glass skills along the way. James hitchhiked east to west many times particularly exploring California, Oregon and the islands off the coast of British Columbia. He then went to Europe and the Middle East visiting Italy, Greece, Turkey, Iran, Pakistan, Afghanistan, and India. He lived in Australia and met the aborigines in Darwin. The aborigine's ways and art had a profound influence on his life and work.

In the 1980s, while traveling in England he met acclaimed Hungarian child prodigy violinist and teacher Kató Havas- and followed her to Oxford to study violin. Kato introduced him to Master Luthier Andrew Dipper. James learned how to make violins and varnishes from Dipper and finesse his skills in sculpture and carving. James met Alvaro Escalante through Dipper and he was invited to move to Tepostlan, Mexico. James was influenced by the Mexican muralists such as Diego Rivera and artist Francisco Toledo and was inspired by Aztec, Mayan, and pre-Columbian sculpture.

In the 1990s, James Simon moved to São Paulo, Brazil where he opened a sculpture studio in Villa Madalena, a cultural district of São Paulo. James friended and collaborated with some of São Paulo and Brazils most distinguished artists including mixed media artist Jose Roberto Aguilar and composer and writer Jorge Mautner.

James moved back to Pittsburgh, PA in 2000 where he converted an old warehouse into his studio and living space. He hosted the nationally acclaimed Gist Street Reading series for 10 years starting in 2001. The readings were held monthly and featured local and national poets and writers. The series was directed by Sherrie Flick along with Nancy Krygowski and Rick Schweikert. The series focused on emerging writers publishing their first or second books. He continues to make sculpture and mosaics.

== Notable projects ==
=== Downtown Pittsburgh's Liberty Avenue Musicians ===
Three musicians and a dog frame the courtyard entrance to a building in the cultural district in downtown Pittsburgh.

In 2003 Simon created three 15-foot concrete musicians in downtown Pittsburgh that pay homage to the musical legacy of the city. The project was commissioned by Eve Picker of No-Wall Productions.

=== Uptown Rhythm at Duquesne University, Pittsburgh, Pennsylvania ===
In 2006 Simon created Uptown Rhythm, a 25-foot tall relief sculpture featured as part of Duquesne University’s multi-million dollar development. The themes depict a day-in-a-life scene that celebrates the university and the neighborhood where the school is located. The colorful composition includes sports, music, animals, and street life.

=== Trumpet Man - Cleveland, Ohio ===
In 2012 Simon worked with Cleveland, Ohio's Buckeye neighborhood, in collaboration with Cleveland Public Art, ParkWorks, and the Buckeye Neighborhood Development to transform a blighted parking lot into a beautiful pocket park featuring the large-scale Trumpet Man sculpture.

=== Braddock, Pennsylvania ===
With the support of Mayor John Fetterman of Braddock, Pennsylvania, an economically depressed industrial town outside of Pittsburgh, Simon worked with the AmeriCorps Braddock Youth Project to create a major public artwork for and with the community. Simon and Braddock's youth created the mosaic "Welcome to Braddock" sign which won Pittsburgh Magazine's "Best Neighborhood Art" award in 2009. Prior to this, in 2008 Simon received a prestigious artist in residency grant from the Mid Atlantic Arts Foundation to design and create an exotic aquatic mosaic park, which is located on Verona Street in the center of Braddock. This was a collaboration between Allegheny County, who donated the land, and the Braddock Youth Projects high school students.

=== Fallen Heroes Memorial, Bloomfield, Pennsylvania ===
In 2011 Simon created the Fallen Heroes memorial in honor of Pittsburgh police officers Paul Sciullo II, Stephen J. Mayhle, and Eric G. Kelly, who were killed in the line of duty in Stanton Heights. The statue is outside the Immaculate Conception- St. Joseph Church on Liberty Avenue in the center of Bloomfield, Pennsylvania. The composition consists of a portrait of Saint Michael the patron saint of the Police (concrete), a mosaic podium with the officer's images, and a large-scale stainless steel police badge laser etched with the date of their deaths.

=== Welcome to Uptown, Pittsburgh, Pennsylvania ===
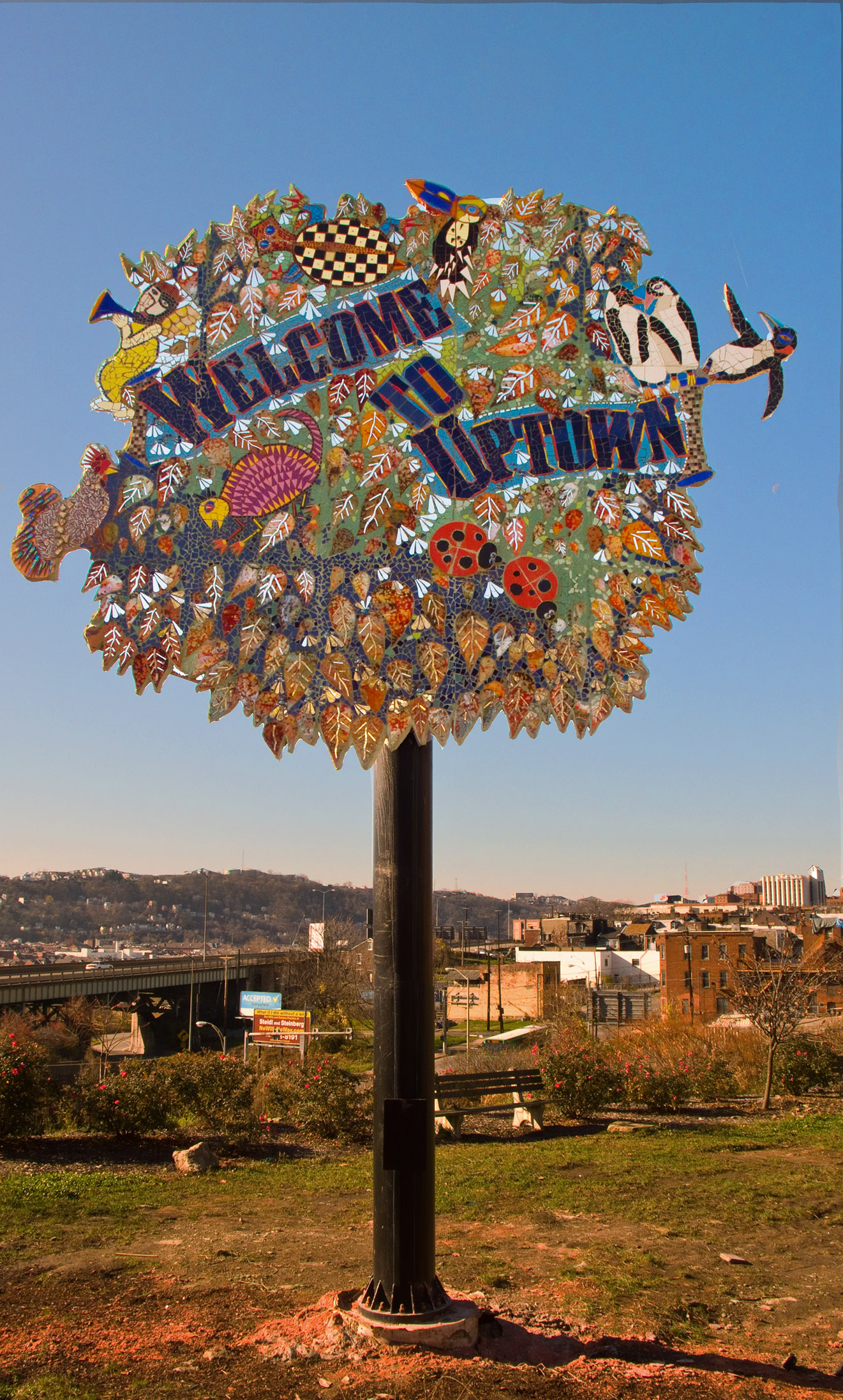
Welcome to Uptown

In 2011 Simon created the Welcome to Uptown sign in collaboration with Uptown Partners and McAuley Ministries. Located at a strategic gateway to downtown Pittsburgh, this public art signage is part of Uptown communities revitalization vision to bring new vibrancy and life to an abandoned corridor.

=== Perry Harvey Sr. Park, Tampa, Florida ===
Two dancers, a large dog and jukebox greet visitors Perry Harvey Sr. Park in Tampa and perform "The Twist"

In 2016 Simon created large-scale gateway sculptures to Perry Harvey Sr. Park. The project was commissioned by the City of Tampa Public Art. The gateway sculptures pay homage to the musical history of the Perry Harvey community, where many important musicians and civil rights leaders lived, including Ray Charles and Ella Fitzgerald. The sculptures were created in clay and cast in concrete with colors and sealers. There are two 16' musicians, two 9' dancers, a juke box, three standup lights, and large dogs.

Musicians, dog and lamp sculptures form the gateway to Perry Harvey Sr. Park in Tampa.

=== Magic River - Bradenton, Florida ===
In 2019 Simon created the “Magic River” mosaic for Bradenton Florida

In 2019 Simon created the Magic River Mosaic, a 120-foot glass and ceramic mosaic commissioned by Realize Bradenton for a new building that houses the Manatee Chamber of Commerce, retail spaces, and a parking garage. The mosaic looks out on to a new public space projected to be completed in 2020. The Mosaic celebrates the diverse cultures and daily life of Bradenton with the symbolic “Manatee River” running through the entire composition, tying the narrative together. The ceramic fish in the river were created by members of the community through two artist led workshops. The glass comes from Youghiogheny glass making factory in Pennsylvania. All other ceramic tiles were created by the artist with the exception of a few sliced agate pieces and some Mexican and antique tile. Simon noted the Pittsburgh Pirates have a stadium, teams and training facilities in LECOM Park in Bradenton, The Marauders, which is why Pirates baseball is a feature.

=== Four Corners Mosaic Sculptures, Cleveland, Ohio ===
Garden Lady is one of four corner mosaic/relief sculptures in the Buckeye neighborhood of Cleveland, OH.

In 2026 Simon finished his Four Corners Mosaic Sculptures installation, with four sculptures honoring the Buckeye neighborhood's history and modern life. This project marked the debut of James Simon's newest offering – a combination of 2D mosaics and 3D relief sculpture into a single piece. Designed with two unique perspectives visible from opposing angles, one side is all mosaic, while the other is a combination of relief and mosaic. Included in this series are The Boxer, Garden Lady, The Astronomer, and Kid with a Boombox.

== Awards ==
- James Simon was awarded the "Artists and Cities Award" in 2015 by Pittsburgh's ACTION Housing. He was the first person to ever receive this award.
