= James S. Simmons (Mississippi politician) =

American politician (1847-?)

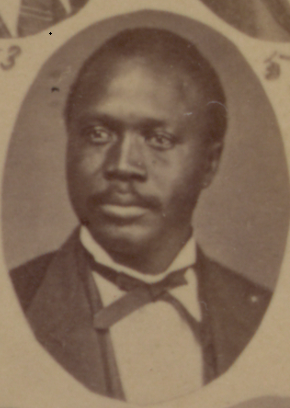
Portrait of Simmons, 1874

James S. Simmons (October 1847 – ?) was a state legislator in Mississippi. He served in the Mississippi House of Representatives from 1874 to 1875 and from 1883 to 1884. He represented Issaquena County and Washington County, Mississippi. He also served as a county tax assessor in Issaquena County.

== See also ==
- African American officeholders from the end of the Civil War until before 1900
