= Simon James (academic) =

British academic of literature (1971–2025)

Simon J. James (1971-2025) was an English academic and specialist in late Victorian and Edwardian fiction, especially George Gissing and H. G. Wells. Professor of English Literature at Durham University, he served as the Head of the Department of English Studies (2015-2018). Between 2009 and 2015, he was the editor of The Wellsian, the journal of the H. G. Wells Society.

As well as publishing a book on George Gissing and writing many academic articles, he has also edited four H. G. Wells novels for Penguin Classics (The History of Mr Polly, Kipps, Love and Mr Lewisham and The New Machiavelli) and has written articles for the Times Literary Supplement and the Oxford Companion to English Literature.

== Published works ==
- Unsettled Accounts: Money and Narrative in the Novels of George Gissing (London: Anthem Press, 2003, ISBN 978-1-84331-107-2)
- Maps of Utopia: H. G. Wells, Modernity and the End of Culture (Oxford: Oxford University Press, 2012, ISBN 978-0-19960-659-7)
