= London Film Location Guide =

- Author: Simon R.H. James
- Language: English
- Subject: London film locations
- Genre: Film history
- Publisher: Batsford
- Publication date: 2007
- Publication place: United Kingdom
- Pages: 276
- ISBN: 0-7134-9062-4
- OCLC: 85690448

London Film Location Guide is a book written by Simon R. H. James in October 2007 covering the locations of films shot in London and first published by Batsford, an imprint of Anova Books.

The author, a Latin teacher and the author of a number of texts on Latin, had researched the subject for ten years in order to make the book a comprehensive film and street index covering over 750 films and 1,500 London streets.

== Reviews ==
Cinedelica found the book to be a wealth of information for film buffs, opining that it offers "detail over and above the call of duty", and that the book offered "fascinating stuff too, both for the film fan and indeed anyone interested in the capital." They also praised the book's coverage of key locations for blockbusters and lesser-known or long-forgotten flicks, enjoying that the book even offers details about even "ridiculously obscure" TV spin-offs like Man About The House listed alongside cult classics like Blow-Up. The review summarized by writing that London Film Location Guide was "incredibly detailed, well-written and well thought out". Maggie Woods of Motorbar writes that with London being "One of the most vibrant and versatile film locations in the world", the book is a fascinating guide" and "great for dipping into for fun or referencing London from these locations". She shares that locations for the 750 films covered include those for Blackmail, A Clockwork Orange, Notting Hill , The French Lieutenant's Woman, The Day of the Jackal , and The Italian Job .

== See also ==
- Anova Books
