= James Simon (journalist) =

American academic

James Simon is a journalist, college professor and dean, and now public administrator. In November 2020, he was elected to a four-year term as Democratic Registrar of Voters in Stratford, Connecticut.

== Academia career ==
Simon began his teaching career as an adjunct professor in the communication department at Rutgers University. After receiving his doctorate, he became an assistant professor in the Communication Department at the University of the Pacific in 1994. He moved to Fairfield University in 1997, starting the journalism program in the English Department, and was promoted to associate professor with tenure in 2001. He was promoted to full professor in spring 2006 and was later elected to serve as chair for five years. Simon was named associate dean of the Fairfield College of Arts and Sciences on July 1, 2012 and became Dean for a one-year term ending July 2015. He was named Dean of the College of Arts and Sciences at the New York Institute of Technology in Fall 2015 and served in that role for two academic years. Simon received the National 2003 Teacher of the Year award by the Small Program Interest Group of the Association for Education in Journalism and Mass Communication (AEJMC). He was a recipient of a national fellowship in the Institute for Journalism Excellence awarded by The American Society of Newspaper Executives.

Simon is co-author (along with David B. Sachsman and JoAnn Valenti) of Environment reporters in the 21st century (New Brunswick, N.J. : Transaction Publishers, ©2010). He is the author of scholarly research articles published in such journals as Political Communication, Public Understanding of Science, and Science Communication, and he serves on the editorial board of journals like Newspaper Research Journal.

== Professional career ==
Simon covered statehouse politics during his 10-year journalism career with the Associated Press. He covered New Jersey State House politics, while serving as New Jersey State News Editor from 1974 to 1978; Rhode Island State House politics from 1979 to 1981; and Massachusetts State House politics from 1981 to 1987. He also served as the Massachusetts State House AP bureau chief from 1983 to 1987.

Following his political journalism career, Simon was appointed by Governor Michael Dukakis to serve as the Assistant Secretary of the Environment for the Commonwealth of Massachusetts in 1987. During the 1988 United States presidential election, he served on the environmental issues committee for Democratic candidate Michael Dukakis. From 1989 to 1990, he served as the director of public relations for the Massachusetts Hospital Association.

== Education ==
Simon received his Bachelor of Arts degree in political science, journalism and urban teacher education from Rutgers University in 1974, where he was co-founder and managing editor of the weekly newspaper on the Rutgers/Livingston campus. Simon also received a Master of Mass Communication degree from the Walter Cronkite School of Journalism and Mass Communication in 1990 and a doctorate from the Watts College of Public Service & Community Solutions
