= Massimo Carmassi =

Italian architect (born 1943)

- Born: 5 June 1943 (age 83); San Giuliano Terme, Italy
- Education: University of Florence
- Occupation: Architect
- Awards: Heinrich Tessenow Medal (1993)
- Website: www.carmassiarchitecture.com

Massimo Carmassi (born 5 June 1943) is an Italian architect.

== Biography ==
Massimo Carmassi graduated from the Faculty of Architecture in Florence in 1970. In 1974, he established the Project Office of the Commune of Pisa and directed it till 1990. From 1981 to 1985, he was the chairman of the Architectural Association in Pisa and its district. Carmassi is recipient of the Heinrich Tessenow gold medal awarded by the Heinrich-Tessenow-Gesellschaft e.V. (Alfred Toepfer Stiftung F.V.S.); he was appointed as a member of the class of Architecture in the Accademia delle Arti del Disegno of Florence and of the Accademia Nazionale di San Luca. He is a member of the Internationale Bauakademie Berlin and an Honorary Fellow of the American Institute of Architects. In 2015 he has been awarded with the Medaglia d'oro all'architettura italiana (Gold Medal for Italian Architecture) by the Triennale di Milano foundation. His work encompasses restoration, new building and urban design. Carmassi is Professor of Architectural and Urban Design in the Iuav University of Venice. He has been teaching Architectural Design in the Schools of Architecture of Ferrara, Genoa, Turin, Reggio Calabria, at Accademia di Architettura di Mendrisio (Università della Svizzera Italiana), Hochschule der Kunst of Berlin and at Syracuse University in New York.

== Design concept ==
The architecture of the past looks at us as the sum of many interventions realized by different generations of patrons, inhabitants and architects, being the result of the work of many unknown authors. For this reason it has a great value and a rare beauty that we can seldom catalogue as it is often due to chance or to the events. The task of our work is to preserve such richness and to restore it, not only for its documental value but also for its aesthetic quality. On the contrary our new buildings aim at being in continuity with history, not for their stylistic features, but for the concept of their design and the syntax of their composition that are both dominated by the aspiration to a longue durée, admitting any change in the use to preserve the identità of architecture

== Main works and projects ==
=== Buildings, urban works and projects ===
- Pisa 1982-2002: Cemetery at San Piero a Grado
- Pontedera (Pisa) 1993-1998: Cooper 2000 Building
- Cascina (Pisa) 1998: Virgo Interferometer, interferometric aerial for gravitational waves
- Rome 1998-99: Italia-EUR Congress Palace. International competition, among the seven selected projects
- Rome 2000: Extension of the National Gallery of Modern Art in Rome. International competition, among the eight selected projects
- Livorno 2001: Urban renovation of the Shanghai Quarter
- Pisa 1986-2002: Rebuilding of the residential and commercial complex at San Michele in Borgo
- Fermo 2002: Renovation of the north side of the old town centre, access to the upper town and bus terminal
- Trevi (Perugia) 2002: School complex, Garibaldi Square
- Arezzo 2002: Extension of the Urban Cemetery
- Turin 2003: Urban renovation of the commercial, service and residential complex in the area called “Lingottino” (project)
- Rome 2004: Urban renovation of the river port complex
- Parma 2007: Residential and service complex for eight hundred students in the university campus
- Arcore (Milan) 2007: Nursery School

=== Restoration works and projects ===
- Pisa 1979/98: Restoration of the medieval walls (mura medioevali) of the neighbouring, buildings and terrains
- Pisa 1989: Restoration of Verdi Theatre (Teatro Verdi Pisa)
- Siena 1992: Ospedale di Santa Maria della Scala. Restoration of the multifunctional complex as Museum – competition, second prize
- Leipzig, German 1995: Reconstruction of the Markt Galerie in the historic city centre as flats and offices – competition, first prize
- Senigaglia 1998: Restoration of the ancient market as Public Library and Historical Archives
- Gavorrano 2001: Restoration of the ravi Marchi Mines as Public Park and Museum
- Guastalla (Reggio Emilia) 2001: Restoration of the Gonzaga's Ducal Palace, as Museum and Public Library
- Ferrara 2002: Museum Complex of Modern and Contemporary Arts –project
- Lucca 2002: Restoration of the royal College in san Frediano's Convent, as Sacred Art Museum
- Verona 2009: Restoration of the grain storage at Santa Marta's military complex, as School of Business and Trade
- Rome 2009: Restoration of the slaughter house(Pelanda) of Testaccio's complex 'ex mattatoio (Rome)

== Selected bibliography ==
- Progetti per una città. Pisa 1975–85, Electa, Milano 1986;
- G. Ciucci, Francesco Dal Co, Atlante dell’Architettura Italiana del Novecento, Electa, Milan,1991, p. 71;
- S. Polano, M. Mulazzani, Guida all’architettura italiana del ’900, Electa, Milan, 1991, pp. 370-371
- Massimo Carmassi, Pisa, Il rilievo della città, by F. Sainati, Alinea Editrice, Florence, 1991
- Architettura della semplicità, Electa, Milano 1992;
- Immagini dell’architettura italiana 1970-1990, Presidenza del Consiglio dei Ministri, Poligrafico, Rome, 1993 p.84;
- Il Restauro del Teatro Verdi di Pisa, Pacini, Pisa 1994;
- Massimo Carmassi, item in Enciclopedia Treccani. Updating volume, Enciclopedia, Rome 1995
- Massimo Carmassi. Progetto urbano e architettura, by G. Lelli, Alinea, Florence, 1996
- Del Restauro: quattordici case, Electa, Milan 1998;
- V. Fontana, Gli ultimi vent’anni, in Profilo di architettura italiana del Novecento, Marsilio, Venice, 1999, pp.283;
- Massimo Carmassi, in Dizionario dell’architettura del Novecento, by V. Magnago Lampugnani, Skira, Genève-Milano, 2000 p. 78
- M. Carmassi, Approcci Metodologici, Progetto di restauro, Metodologie di progettazione del Restauro, in Il Manuale del Restauro Architettonico, (scientific direction of L. Zevi), Mancosu Editore, Roma, 2001, pp. 151-211
- Architetture del Novecento. La Toscana, by E. Godoli, Regione Toscana-Fondazione Michelucci-Edizioni Polistampa, Firenze, 2001 pp. 156-159, 304-311, 324-325;
- R. Ingersoll, Massimo Carmassi, in “c3korea”, n. 214, 2002 pp. 68–145 (monographic);
- Massimo & Gabriella Carmassi, Senigallia Public Library, Verba Volant, London 2002;
- The Phaidon Atlas of contemporary world architecture, Phaidon Press, London, 2004 p. 569:
- M. Mulazzani, Opere e progetti, Massimo e Gabriella Carmassi, Electa, Documenti di architettura Collection, introduction by F. Dal Co, Electa, Milano 2004
- AA. VV., Identità dell'architettura italiana 3, introduction by Paolo Zermani, Edizioni Diabasis, pp. 34–35;
- Massimo Carmassi, Pisa, la ricostruzione di San Michele in Borgo, Il Poligrafo, Padova 2005;
- Massimo Carmassi, Conservazione e architettura, Progetto per il campus universitario di Verona, Marsilio, Venice 2007.

== See also ==
- Pisa
- Cemetery at San Piero a Grado
- Cemetery at San Michele agli Scalzi
- San Michele in Borgo complex
- Verdi Theater (Pisa)
- Cooper 2000 Building
- Medieval walls of Pisa
