= Heinrich Tessenow Medal =

Architecture prize

The Heinrich Tessenow Gold Medal (Heinrich-Tessenow-Medaille) is an architecture award established in 1963 by the Alfred Toepfer Stiftung F.V.S. of Hamburg in honour of Heinrich Tessenow. It is awarded by the Heinrich-Tessenow-Gesellschaft e.V. "to honour people who have achieved distinction in craft and industrial form-making and in the teaching of the culture of living and building, and who have through their life's work acted in the spirit of Heinrich Tessenow". Until 2006, the medal was awarded annually.

== Winners ==
- 1963: Franz Schuster, Vienna
- 1964: Kay Fisker, Copenhagen
- 1965: Otto Dellemann, Hanover
- 1966: Heinrich Rettig, Dresden
- 1967: Mia Seeger, Stuttgart
- 1968: Wilhelm Wagenfeld, Stuttgart
- 1969: Wilhelm Tiedje, Stuttgart
- 1970: Wilhelm Hübotter, Hanover
- 1971: Werner Wirsing, Munich
- 1972: Hans Döllgast, Munich
- 1973: Steen Eiler Rasmussen, Copenhagen
- 1974: Heinrich Bartmann, Baden-Baden
- 1975: Otto Kindt, Hamburg
- 1976: Arnold Braune, Oldenburg i. Old.
- 1977: Godber Nissen, Hamburg
- 1978: Gerhard Müller-Menckens, Bremen
- 1979: Hellmut Weber, Stuttgart
- 1980: Helmut Hentrich, Düsseldorf
- 1981: Povl Abrahamsen, Dragør, Denmark
- 1982: Friedrich Seegy, Nuremberg
- 1983: Kornel E. Polgar, Waddingsveen, Holland
- 1984: Joachim Schürmann, Cologne
- 1985: Theo Steinhauser, Munich
- 1986: Viggo Møller-Jensen, Copenhagen, Denmark, and Karljosef Schattner, Eichstätt
- 1987: Horst von Bassewitz, Hamburg
- 1988: Johannes Spalt, Vienna
- 1989: Peter Zumthor, Haldenstein
- 1990: Erich Kulke, Bussau im Wendland and Wilhelm Landzettel, Gehrden
- 1991: Theodor Hugues, Munich
- 1992: Giorgio Grassi, Milan
- 1993: Massimo Carmassi, Pisa
- 1994: Kurt Ackermann, Munich
- 1995: not awarded
- 1996: Peter Kulka, Dresden and Cologne
- 1997: Sverre Fehn, Oslo
- 1998: Juan Navarro Baldeweg, Madrid
- 1999: David Chipperfield, London
- 2000: Heinz Tesar, Vienna
- 2001: Eduardo Souto de Moura, Porto
- 2002: Peter Märkli, Zurich
- 2003: Mikko Heikkinen and Markku Komonen, Helsinki
- 2004: Gilles Perraudin, Lyon
- 2005: Miroslav Šik, Zurich and Prague
- 2006: Sergison Bates, London
- 2007: not awarded
- 2008: not awarded
- 2009: Richard Sennett, New York City
- 2010: not awarded
- 2011: Roger Diener, Basel
- 2012: not awarded
- 2013: Alberto Campo Baeza, Madrid
- 2014: Winfried Brenne, Berlin
- 2016: Anne Lacaton and Jean-Philippe Vassal, Paris
- 2017: Vittorio Magnago Lampugnani, Zürich
- 2018: Miller & Maranta, Basel
- 2019: Patrick Bouchain, Paris
- 2023: 6a architects, London
