= Vittorio Magnago Lampugnani =

Italian architect and academic

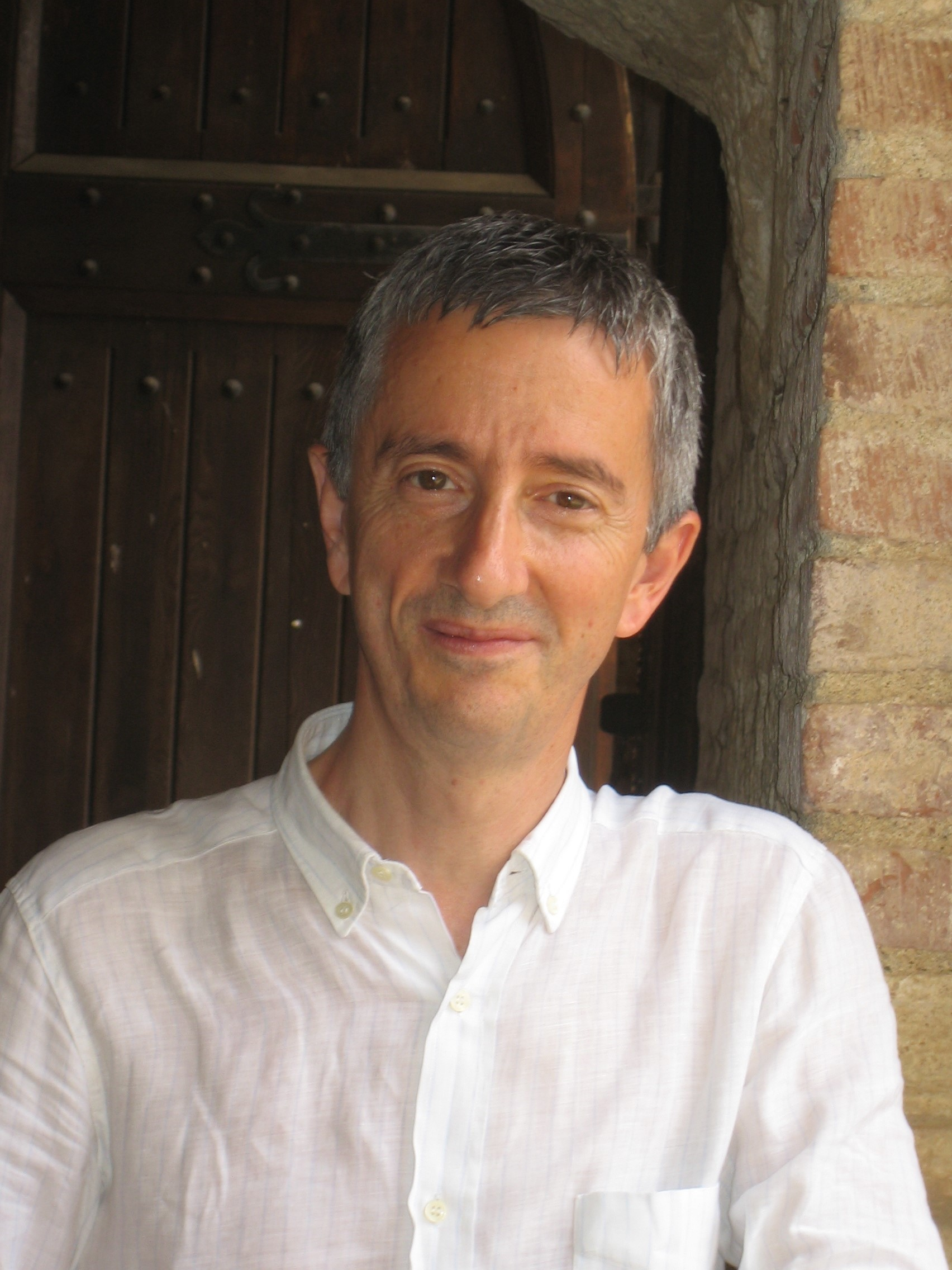
Vittorio Magnago Lampugnani, 2015

Vittorio Magnago Lampugnani (born 1951, in Rome, Italy) is an architect, architectural theorist and architectural historian as well as a professor emeritus for the History of Urban Design at the Swiss Federal Institute of Technology Zurich (ETH Zurich). He practices and promotes a formally disciplined, timelessly classic, and aesthetically sustainable form of architecture, one without modernist or postmodernist extravagances. As an author and editor of several acclaimed works of architectural history and theory, his ideas are widely cited.

== Academic education ==
Lampugnani attended the Swiss primary school in Rome, then the German grammar school in Rome. From 1970 to 1973, he studied architecture at the University La Sapienza in Rome as well as at the University of Stuttgart. Lampugnani graduated in 1973 and completed his doctorate at the University of Stuttgart in 1977. In 1983, he acquired the Dottore in Architettura at the University of Rome.

== Teaching and research ==
Between the years of 1974 to 1980, Lampugnani was a research assistant at the Institute for Principles of Modern Architecture at the University of Stuttgart at the chair of Jürgen Joedicke. From 1981 to 1982, he was awarded a German Academic Exchange Service (DAAD) scholarship under the Berlin program of artistic exchanges. Following from 1981 to 1983, Lampugnani also held a research fellowship from the American Council of Learned Societies at Columbia University in New York. In 1983, he was appointed professor at the International Summer School of Fine Arts in Salzburg. From 1984 to 1985, he was a visiting professor at the Department of Architecture, at the Graduate School of Design at Harvard University in Cambridge, Massachusetts. From 1985 to 1986, he was a fellow at the Berlin Institute for Advanced Study. In 1990, Lampugnani was appointed professor to the State University of Fine Arts (Städelschule) in Frankfurt am Main. From 1994 to 2016, he was a full professor for the History of Urban Design at the Swiss Federal Institute of Technology Zurich (ETH Zurich). From 1998 to 2001, Lampugnani was appointed dean of the Department of Architecture at ETH Zurich, after which he was the vice-dean of the faculty (2001–2003). From 2005 to 2007, he was appointed dean of the Network City and Landscape (NSL) at ETH Zurich. In the years between 2002 and 2007, Lampugnani founded and directed the postgraduate program «Urban Forms. Conditions and Consequences». From 2007 to 2010, he was the director of the working group «Spatial Sciences in the ETH Domain». Since 2008, he was deputy dean, two years later in 2010, he was appointed dean of the Institute for the History and Theory of Architecture (gta). During his tenure at ETH Zurich, Lampugnani has given numerous international lectures as well as held visiting professorships at institutions including: Harvard University, Escuela Técnica Superior de Arquitectura at the University of Navarra in Pamplona, and the Faculty of Architecture at the Politecnico in Milan.

Lampugnani developed his own architectural approach in the circles of Vittorio Gregotti, Aldo Rossi and especially Giorgio Grassi, but also Oswald Mathias Ungers and Josef Paul Kleihues. As a consultant and theoretical brain of the Internationale Bauaustellung (International Architecture Exhibition, IBA) for new buildings he was able to implement his architectural convictions in the 1980s. A decade later he was one of the protagonists of the Berliner Architekturstreit, which was started over the guiding principles of the new buildings of the inner city of Berlin after the German reunification. He propagates a formally disciplined, timelessly classic and also aesthetically sustainable architecture without modernist or postmodernist extravagances.

== Architectural work ==
Lampugnani opened his first architectural practice first in Berlin in 1980, later in Milan (Studio di Architettura) and in Zurich (Baukontor Architekten, with partner Jens Bohm). Among his most important projects:

- 2015 commercial building at Schiffbauplatz in Zurich, with Jens Bohm
- 2014 parking garage in East Hanover, New Jersey
- 2008 underground railway station Mergellina in Naples
- 2008 office building at the Fabrikstrasse 12 on the Novartis Campus in Basel
- 2007 master plan of the Richti complex in Wallisellen as well as planning of the open spaces and residential building Konradhof, with Jens Bohm
- 2004 reshaping of the Danube banks in Regensburg (2004ff), with Wolfgang Weinzierl and others
- 2001 urban design master plan of the Novartis Campus in St. Johann, Basel (2001ff)
- 2001 entrance square of the Audi factory in Ingolstadt (1999–2001), with Wolfgang Weinzierl
- 1999 housing group in Maria Lankowitz (Steiermark), with Marlene Dörrie und Michael Regner
- 1996 office building in Block 109 in Berlin, with Marlene Dörrie

These and other projects have been published in various monographs (Vittorio Magnago Lampugnani, Urban Architectures, Quart Verlag, 2006; Urban Design as Craft, gta Verlag, 2011) and in the most significant architecture magazines, amongst them Casabella, Domus and Lotus international, Milan, Arquitectura Viva, Madrid, and AMC (Architecture, Mouvement, Continuité), Paris. He was member of various juries for architecture competitions and prizes, among them the Praemium Imperiale, Tokyo (consultant); the Mies van der Rohe Award for European Architecture, Barcelona (chairman) and the Green Prize for Urban Planning, Harvard University.

== Exhibitions ==
1984 Lampugnani directed the exhibition «The adventure of ideas in architecture. Architecture and philosophy since the industrial revolution 1750 - 1980» at the New National Gallery of Berlin. (1985 the exhibition was shown under the title «L'avventura delle idee nell'architettura 1750-1980» at Palazzo della Triennale in Milan.) In 1987, the exhibition «Le città immaginate: un viaggio in Italia» (Imagined cities: a journey through Italy) followed, also at the Palazzo della Triennale (with Vittorio Savi). Lampugnani was director of the German Architecture Museum in Frankfurt am Main from 1990 to 1995, where he organized numerous exhibitions, symposia and lecture series. In addition, he curated the exhibition «Rinascimento. Da Brunelleschi a Michelangelo: La rappresentazione dell'architettura» in 1994 at the Palazzo Grassi in Venice (with Henry Millon). Between 1995 and 1996, the exhibition travelled to the National Gallery of Art (Washington DC), the Musée des Monuments historiques (Paris), and the Altes Museum (Berlin). Several of his architectural works have repeatedly been exhibited in solo and group exhibitions at the Venice Biennale.

== Consulting and specialist publications ==
Lampugnani was a scientific consultant of the Internationale Bauaustellung Berlin, die Neubaugebiete (International Architecture Exhibition, Berline, development areas) from 1980 to 1984. During approximately the same time, he was a member of the editorial board of Casabella in Milan. Between 1986 and 1990 he was the deputy editor, from 1990 to 1996 the sole editor of "Domus". He was a member of the editorial board of "The Harvard Design Magazine". In 2010 he was the consultant for urban design and architecture for the reconstruction of L'Aquila. He's been writing for the Neue Zürcher Zeitung (NZZ) on a regular basis since 1995.

== Awards and memberships ==
Since 1978, he is member of the Baden-Württemberg Institute for Architects, since 1979 of the Deutscher Werkbund. In 1987, Lampugnani was prize awarded by the Comité International des Critiques d'Architecture. He has been a member, since 1991, of the Association of German Architects, and, since 1995, of the Association of Swiss Architects. From 1992 to 1996, member of the architectural advisory board of the Deutsche Bank, Frankfurt am Main. From 1999 to 2002, member of the scientific advisory board of the Triennale die Milano and the Musée d’Architecture Français in Paris. From 2000 to 2004, member of the advisory board of the Collegium Helveticum in Zurich, and the Swiss Science and Innovation Council in Berne. From 2001 to 2014, member of the Steering Committee of all Novartis campus sites. From 2012 to 2014, member of the advisory board of Munich Airport. Since 2001 member of the Internationale Bauakademie Berlin, as well as of the scientific committee of the Oskar von Miller Forum in Munich. In 2006, he was awarded with the prize of the Union of Architects e.V., Munich for his book «Die Modernität des Dauerhaften». In 2009, 2011 and 2017, he was awarded with the Golden Owl for his exceptional teaching at ETH Zurich, in 2010, Lampuganni received the Bruno Zevi Book Award from the International Committee of Architectural Critics, the Credit Suisse Award for the best teacher of the entire ETH (2017) and the Heinrich-Tessenow Medal (2017).

== Publications ==
- Architektur und Städtebau des 20. Jahrhunderts. Hatje Cantz Verlag, Stuttgart 1980.
- Architecture of the 20th century in drawings: utopia and reality. Rizzoli international, New York 1982.
- Architecture and city planning in the 20th century. Van Nostrand Reinhold, New York 1985.
- Encyclopedia of 20th century architecture. Harry N. Abrams, New York 1986. ISBN 978-3-7757-0738-1
- Architektur als Kultur - die Ideen und die Formen: Aufsätze 1970–1985. DuMont Buchverlag, Cologne 1986.
- Museum Architecture in Frankfurt 1980 - 1990. Prestel, Munich 1990.
- Moderne Architektur in Deutschland 1900–1950: Reform und Tradition. Ed., with Romana Schneider, Hatje Cantz Verlag, Stuttgart 1992.
- Moderne Architektur in Deutschland 1900–1950: Expressionismus und Neue Sachlichkeit. Ed., with Romana Schneider, Hatje Cantz Verlag, Stuttgart 1992. ISBN 978-3-7757-0452-6
- Die Modernität des Dauerhaften. Essays zu Stadt, Architektur und Design. Wagenbach Verlag, Berlin 1996. ISBN 978-3-8031-2676-4
- Museums for a New Millennium: Concepts, Projects, Buildings. With Angeli Sachs, Prestel, Munich 1999.
- Die Architektur, die Tradition und der Ort. Regionalismen in der europäischen Stadt. Ed., Deutsche Verlags-Anstalt (DVA), Stuttgart 2000. ISBN 3-421-03223-8
- Verhaltene Geschwindigkeit. Die Zukunft der telematischen Stadt. Wagenbach Verlag, Berlin 2002. ISBN 978-3-8031-5166-7
- Architekturtheorie 20. Jahrhundert. Positionen, Programme, Manifeste. Ed., with Ruth Hanisch, Ulrich Maximilian Schumann and Wolfgang Sonne, Hatje Cantz Verlag, Ostfildern-Ruit 2004. ISBN 978-3-7757-1375-7
- Stadtformen. Die Architektur der Stadt zwischen Imagination und Konstruktion. Ed., with Matthias Noell, gta Verlag, Zurich 2005. ISBN 978-3-85676-160-8
- Stadtarchitekturen / Urban Architectures. Quart Verlag, Luzern 2006. ISBN 978-3-907631-71-3.
- Novartis Campus: A Contemporary Work Environment. Premises, Elements, Perspectives. Hatje Cantz Verlag, Ostfildern 2009.
- Die Stadt im 20. Jahrhundert. 2 volumes. Verlag Klaus Wagenbach, Berlin 2010. ISBN 978-3-8031-3633-6
- Urban Design as Craft. Eleven conversations and seven projects 1999–2011. gta Verlag, Zurich 2011. ISBN 978-3-85676-295-7
- Anthologie zum Städtebau. Volume I-III. Ed., with Katia Frey and Eliana Perotti, Gebr. Mann Verlag, Berlin 2005, 2008 and 2014. ISBN 978-3-7861-2522-8
- Enzyklopädie zum gestalteten Raum. Im Spannungsfeld zwischen Stadt und Landschaft. Ed., with Konstanze Sylva Domhardt and Rainer Schützeichel, gta Verlag, Zurich 2014.
- Radikal normal. Positionen zur Architektur der Stadt. Hatje Cantz Verlag, Ostfildern 2015. ISBN 978-3-7757-4007-4.
- Voreingenommene Erzählungen. Architekturgeschichte als Ideengeschichte. gta Verlag, Zürich 2016. ISBN 978-3-85676-357-2.
- Manuale zum Städtebau. Die Systematisierung des Wissens von der Stadt 1870-1950. Ed., with Katrin Albrecht, Helene Bihlmaier und Lukas Zurfluh, DOM publishers, 2017. ISBN 978-3-86922-539-5.
- Die Stadt von der Neuzeit bis zum 19. Jahrhundert. Urbane Entwürfe in Europa und Nordamerika. Wagenbach, 2017. ISBN 978-3-8031-3667-1.
- Die Stadt als Raumentwurf. Theorien und Projekte im Städtebau seit dem Ende des 19. Jahrhunderts. Ed., with Rainer Schützeichel, Deutscher Kunstverlag, 2017. ISBN 3-422-07426-0.
- Atlas zum Städtebau. Ed., with Harald R. Stühlinger und Markus Tubbesing, Hirmer, 2018. ISBN 978-3-7774-2966-3.
- Bedeutsame Belanglosigkeiten. Kleine Dinge im Stadtraum. Wagenbach Verlag, Berlin 2019. ISBN 978-3-8031-3687-9
