= Sergison Bates architects =

Architecture firm

- Industry: Architecture
- Founded: 1996; 30 years ago
- Founders: Jonathan Sergison and Stephen Bates
- Number of locations: 2 studios: London, Zurich
- Website: sergisonbates.com/en

Sergison Bates architects is an architectural practice with offices in London and Zurich. The practice was founded in 1996 in London by Jonathan Sergison (born 1964) and Stephen Bates (born 1964). Their long-standing collaborator Mark Tuff has been a partner since 2006. Sergison Bates is best known for residential buildings but has also realised public and institutional projects in the UK, continental Europe, and China.

In addition to their work as practising architects, both Sergison and Bates have taught at various universities. Sergison has been a professor at the Accademia di Architettura in Mendrisio since 2008, while Bates has been professor and joint head of the Department for Urban Planning and Housing (Lehrstuhl für Städtebau und Wohnungswesen) at the Technical University of Munich, together with Bruno Krucker, since 2009. Both architects have written and lectured on a wide range of topics related to architectural design. In 2006 they were awarded the Heinrich Tessenow Gold Medal and the Erich Schelling Medal for their contribution to architecture.

== Buildings ==
Jonathan Sergison and Stephen Bates met in London in the early 1990s and were part of a group of architects, theorists, and artists who met regularly between 1994 and 1995. The group, informally known as 'Papers on architecture', shared an interest in the urban character of London and the work of Alison and Peter Smithson. Early realised projects by Sergison Bates architects include the public house in Walsall and the semi-detached house in Stevenage, both of which employ motifs of informal architecture.

A number of other small scale projects, primarily in London, followed. These continued the practice's interest in developing a robust architectural expression through lightweight, low-tech construction methods, such as thin brick-slip façade panels on the Studio house in Bethnal Green and cement boards used as cladding for a timber panel structure in the self-build housing project in Tilbury. This preoccupation with breathing, layered wall constructions culminated in the exhibition project and book Brick-work: thinking and making.

The unrealised competition design for a museum on the Danish island of Bornholm, included in Brick-work, indicated a shift towards heavier and more monolithic construction form and spatial expression. Examples of this change include the urban housing project in Finsbury Park, built with loadbearing brickwork and precast concrete, and the Centre for the Applied Arts in Ruthin, which adopted in-situ cast concrete structure and pigmented façade elements.

From 2010, Sergison Bates architects received commissions through design competitions for projects in Flanders (Belgium), Switzerland, and Austria. In 2016 the firm completed the Welcome Centre and offices for the Novartis Institutes for BioMedical Research in Shanghai, China.

== Writing ==
In addition to their built work, Sergison Bates have produced a substantial body of texts, either co-written or authored independently. Many originated as lectures notes or articles for architectural magazines. Sergison and Bates have so far published three collections of essays: Papers (2002), Papers 2 (2007), and Papers 3 (2016), comprising 54 essays in total. Their texts have been described as phenomenological observations of the built environment. The architects regard writing as an integral part of the reflective process of architectural design.

In the introduction to a lecture given at the Harvard School of Design, Iñaki Ábalos characterised Sergison Bates' work and approach to architecture as follows: "In my opinion there is a serious understanding of the meaning of the notion of material cultural in their work, combined with a radical sense of provocation. Radical in the etymological sense, because it goes to the roots, to the radice, the origins and sense of our historical, typological and material patrimonies, understood as the main references an architect has to deal with if he or she pretends to have a sense of time of the city as a collective cultural construction".

== Approach and influences ==
In the essay "Tectonic presence", Irina Davidovici describes the work of Sergison Bates architects as oscillating between the complementary aspects of the "formal" and the "tectonic", in which "the use of images has always been sustained by constructional research". In the preface to the catalogue of selected works published in 2006, architectural historian Ákos Morávanszky writes that the architecture of Sergison Bates is concerned with "precision", interpreted as an "expression that unveils the significance of nuance".

Alongside their identity-defining interest in the work of the Smithsons, both their buildings and writings, and in "images of ordinary typologies", the work of Sergison Bates is also informed by English classicism, exemplified in their fascination with Hardwick Hall. The architects have additionally stated that the work and ideas of Heinrich Tessenow resonate with their approach to architecture.

== Selected projects ==
The listed years indicate the year of completion:

- KANAL — Centre Pompidou, Brussels, Belgium
- Welcome Centre and offices, Shanghai, China (2016)
- Care home, Wingene, Belgium (2016)
- Suburban housing, Aldershot, Hampshire, England (2016)
- University campus, Whitechapel, London (2015)
- Urban housing and studios, Nordbahnhof, Vienna, Austria (2013)
- House, Cadaqués, Spain (2011)
- Urban housing and crèche, Geneva, Switzerland (2011)
- Care home, Huise-Zingem, Belgium (2011)
- City library, Blankenberge, Belgium (2011)
- Urban housing, Finsbury Park, London (2008)
- Centre for the Applied Arts, Ruthin, Wales (2008)
- Holiday house, Tisbury, Wiltshire, England (2004)
- Studio house, Bethnal Green, London (2004)
- Suburban housing, Stevenage, Hertfordshire, England (2000)
- Public house, Walsall, West Midlands, England (1998)

== Publications ==
- El Croquis no. 187, December 2016 ISBN 978-8488386939
- Papers 3, Quart Verlag, Luzern 2016 ISBN 978-3037611074
- Buildings, Quart Verlag, Luzern 2012 ISBN 978-3037610619
- Papers 2, London 2007 ISBN 978-0954237110
- Brick-work: thinking and making, gta Verlag, Zurich 2005 ISBN 978-3856761714
- 2G no. 34: Sergison Bates, Gustavo Gili, Barcelona 2005 ISBN 978-8425220234
- Papers, London 2001 ISBN 978 0954237103

== Awards ==
- RIBA Stirling Prize 2026 Shortlist (a house at Fairmead, Epping Forest)
- RIBA Stirling Prize 2023 Shortlist (Lavender Hill Courtyard Housing, Clapham, London)
- RIBA National Awards 2023 (Lavender Hill Courtyard Housing)
- RIBA London Awards 2023 (Lavender Hill Courtyard Housing)
- RIBA South Awards 2016, (Suburban housing, Aldershot, Hampshire)
- RIBA National Awards 2015 (Hult International Business School, London)
- RIBA Regional London Awards 2015 (Hult International Business School, London)
- Österreichischer Bauherrenpreis 2014 (Urban housing, Vienna, Austria)
- International Society of Typographic Designers Certificate of excellence 2014 (Buildings, Quart Verlag, Lucerne 2013)
- DAM Architectural Book Awards 2013 (Bauten, Quart Verlag, Lucerne 2013)
- Distinction Romande d'Architecture 2014, (Urban housing and crèche, Geneva, Switzerland)
- RIBA International Awards 2012 (Urban housing and crèche, Geneva, Switzerland)
- Dewi-Prys Thomas Prize 2009, (Centre for the applied arts, Ruthin, Wales, UK)
- RIBA Awards 2009 (Centre for the applied arts, Ruthin, Wales)
- RIBA Awards 2009 (Urban housing, Finsbury Park)
- Heinrich Tessenow Gold Medal for Architecture 2006
- Erich Schelling Medal for Architecture 2006
- D&AD Yellow Pencil Award 2006 (Brick-work: thinking and making, Quart Verlag 2005)
- Housing Design Awards 2004 (Mixed-use development, Wandsworth, London)
- Housing Design Awards 2003 (Self-build housing project, Tilbury, Essex)
- Wood Awards 2003 (Self-build housing, Tilbury, Essex)
- Housing Design Award 2000 (Suburban housing, Stevenage, Hertfordshire)
- D&AD Award 2000 (FSB exhibition stand at Spectrum Product Fair, Earls Court, London in collaboration with Adam Levene)
- CAMRA best pub award, New-build category 1999 (Public house, Walsall, West Midlands)
