= Gold Medal for Italian Architecture =

Architecture and design award

The Gold Medal for Italian Architecture, Italian: Medaglia d'oro all'architettura italiana, is a triennial Italian architecture prize. It has been awarded since 2003 by the Triennale di Milano in collaboration with the Ministero dei beni e delle attività culturali e del turismo (the Italian ministry of culture), and with MADE expo, a trade fair for the construction industry.

Recipients of the medal have been: Umberto Riva and PierPaolo Ricatti in 2003; the Renzo Piano Building Workshop in 2006; Doriana and Massimiliano Fuksas in 2009; Vincenzo Latina in 2012; and Massimo Carmassi and Università Iuav di Venezia in 2015. Four "career" medals were also awarded in 2015, to Mario Bellini, Luigi Caccia Dominioni, Franco Purini and Francesco Venezia.

== History ==
Starting in 1932, awards were granted in accordance with international standards established by the Bureau International des Expositions (BIE), by an international jury composed of members from each representative sector. The competition aimed to evaluate.

Each year, the following awards were given: Grand Prize, and Gold, Silver, and Bronze Medals.

Among the most notable awardees were architects Gualtiero Galmanini (Gold Medal for Italian architecture in 1947), Lodovico Barbiano di Belgiojoso, Enrico Peressutti, Ernesto Nathan Rogers, and Pietro Lingeri, who won the Grand Prize in the Architecture, Construction, Urban Planning, Materials, and Construction Methods category in 1951. In 1957, the Gold Medal for Italian Architecture was awarded to Achille, Pier Giacomo Castiglioni, Gillo Dorfles, Marco Zanuso, Bruno Munari, and Roberto Sambonet. In 1972, the awards were decided by a single international jury.
