= Andrea Granchi =

Italian artist and filmmaker

Andrea Granchi (11 June 1947) is an Italian artist, film maker and former professor at Accademia di Belle Arti di Firenze. He participated at both Biennale di Venezia and Triennale di Milano. In his production, especially in the period of the COVID-19 Pandemic, he often painted big landscapes and images. He is the President of the “Classe di Pittura” at the Accademia delle Arti del Disegno.
