= Alfred Toepfer Stiftung F.V.S. =

The Alfred Toepfer Stiftung F.V.S. is a German foundation established in 1931 by the Hamburg merchant Alfred Toepfer. The foundation is committed to promoting European unification and ensuring cultural diversity and understanding between the countries of Europe.

== History ==
The rich industrialist Alfred Toepfer is considered, by the contemporary historiographic criticism, a controversial figure; philanthropist and lover of the arts, he had a significant role in the culture, politics and economic environment of Nazi Germany from the 30s until the end of the Second World War. The activity of Toepfer in between the two World Wars, is well documented by a massive cultural promotion of the ideas of common ethics and identity, obviously symbiotic with Nazi ideology. Toepfer however, after the war, denied any kind of Nazi involvement completely and categorically.

The substantial abdication of his politic and ideologic past, is recognised by critics nowadays in the important range of prizes instituted by the ^{[a]} foundation, which are:

- The Herder Prize, established in 1963 and named for Johann Gottfried von Herder, is a prestigious international prize, dedicated to the promotion of scientific, art and literature relations, and presented to scholars and artists from Central and Southeastern Europe whose life and work have improved the cultural understanding of European countries and their peaceful interrelations.
- The Shakespeare Prize was an annual prize for writing or performance awarded to a British citizen.
- The Robert Schuman Prize for European unity was a prize awarded annually in memory of former French Prime Minister, Robert Schuman.^{[b]}

The foundation cooperates also with the most important German universities and renowned cultural associations. The Heinrich Tessenow Medal is a prestigious architecture prize, created by the Alfred Toepfer Stiftung F.V.S. in 1963 in memoriam of Rostock architect Heinrich Tessenow. The prize is annually assigned by the Heinrich-Tessenow-Gesellschaft e.V. and among the rewardeds are Giorgio Grassi (1992), Juan Navarro Baldeweg (1998), David Chipperfield (1999), Eduardo Souto de Moura (2001) besides the Pritzker Prize winners Sverre Fehn (1997) and Peter Zumthor (1989).

== See also ==
- KAIROS Prize

== Notes ==
a. The name of its founder was added in occasion of his centennial birth, in the 1994. b. The award, first given in 1966, was discontinued in 2000.
