= Tingbjerg =

Danish housing project

Coordinates: 55°43′12″N 12°29′09″E

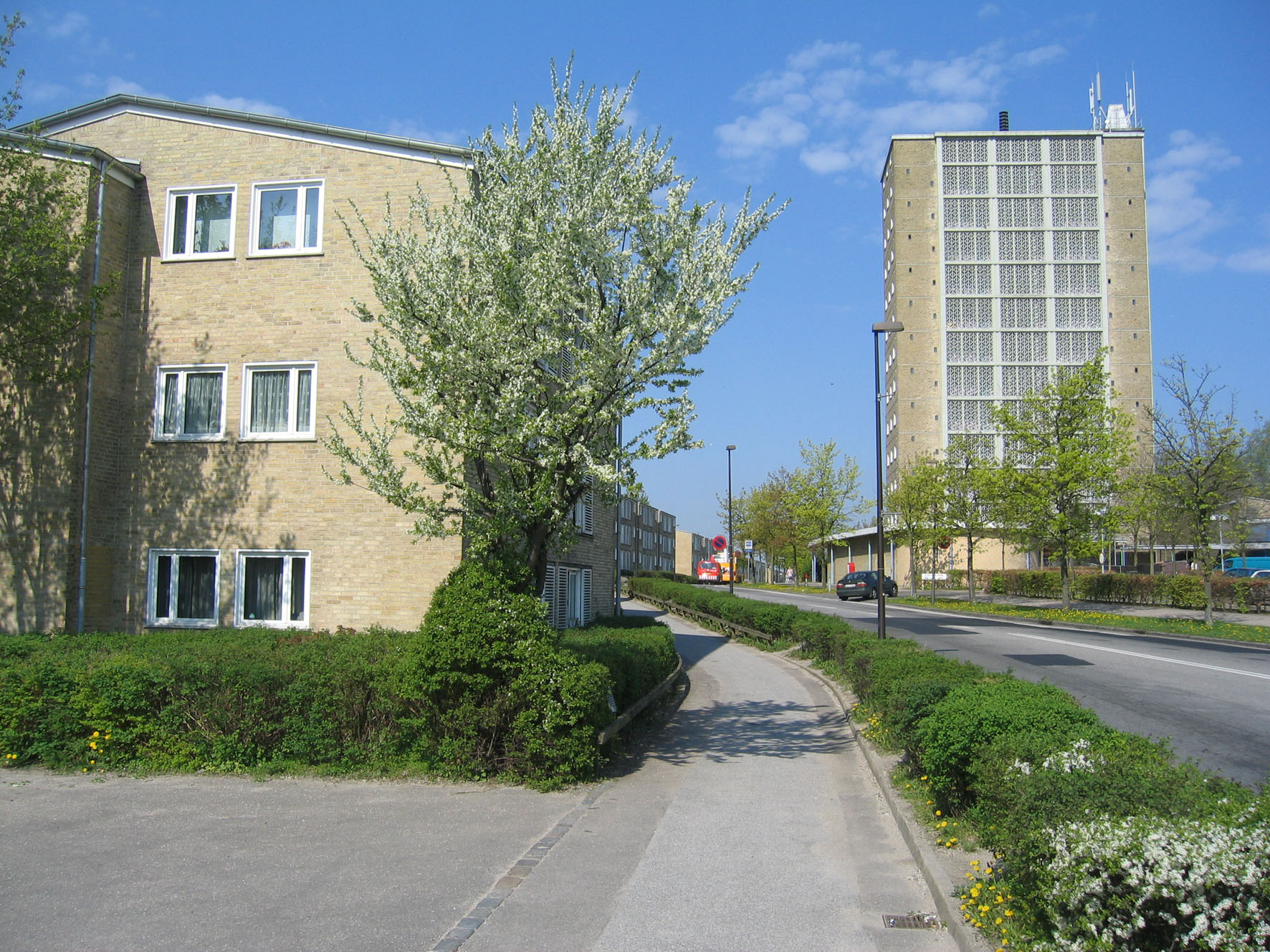
A Tingbjerg street

Tingbjerg is a large housing project designed and built from 1950 to 1972 by Steen Eiler Rasmussen as principal architect. It is located in Copenhagen County, 6 km northwest of the center of Copenhagen in Denmark. This parish is one of the poorest and the most multicultural in Denmark: according to the official statistics in Denmark, in 2022, of 6,278 inhabitants, 68.5% are either immigrants or descendant of immigrants from non-western countries.

== Steen Eiler Rasmussen and C.Th.Sørensen ==
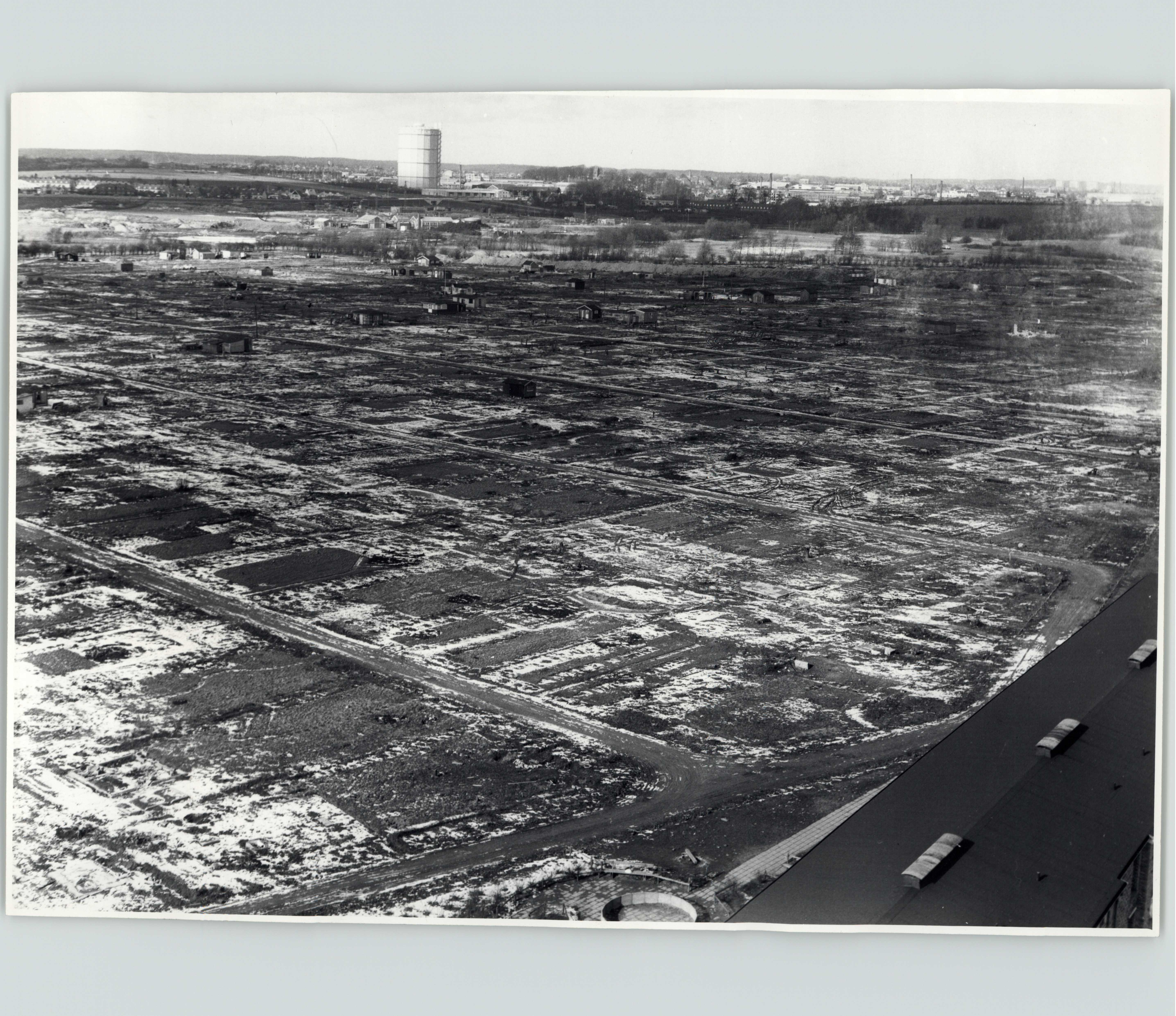
Allotment gardens removed in preparation for development, 1962

The Architect and Professor Steen Eiler Rasmussen work with the fellow Professor and Landscape Architect C.Th. Sørensen to create a self-contained housing development. The housing is 3 storey blocks with a single landmark tower of 12 storeys which can be seen from surrounding neighborhoods. Housing is arranged in blocks that open towards the south and west making Tingbjerg open and giving direct sunlight to the apartments. Yellow brick walls, shallow pitched roofs and many green spaces are the dominant features of Tingbjerg. Plans to connect Tingbjerg to the local rail network failed, and subsequently a lack of express bus connections and a single point for vehicle entry into Tingbjerg has left it somewhat isolated from the surrounding city. Cycle access is generally good with routes along Hareskovvej, towards the city centre, and Vestvolden. Along Ruten, Steen Eiler Rasmussen's Lille Torv (Little Square) and Store Torv (Big Square) which have served as an elongated town centre are being removed as part of the ongoing densification of Tingbjerg.

== Tingbjerg Sports Park ==
The Sports Park on the eastern edge of Tingbjerg is home to Brønshøj Boldklub and Copenhagen Cricket Club.

== Urban nature ==
Tingbjerg is surrounded by Utterslev Mose to the west, north and east and Vestvolden to the south. These areas are a mixture of open lawns, scrub and woods with the canal of Vestvolden meeting the lake system of Utterslev Mose just south of Tingbjerg.

== Violence and discrimination ==
There have been several instances of harassment and criminality in Tingbjerg. The local priest (an open homosexual) was harassed by young Muslim males from the neighborhood, and forced to leave his occupation.

There has been gang violence in Tingbjerg. On 15 August 2008, Osman Nuri Dogan, a 19-year-old Turk, was shot and killed by an AK81 member in Tingbjerg. On 2 November 2017, a 20-year-old man was shot and killed by members of Brothas during the ongoing gang war.

Tingbjerg was on the "list of areas to change" (listen over omdannelseområder) from 2018 to 2023.
