= Diener & Diener =

Swiss architectural firm

Diener & Diener is an architectural firm established in Basel, Switzerland, in 1942. The second generation of Diener & Diener has been active since 1980. The Basel office, along with its subsidiary in Berlin, has been headed by Roger Diener, since 2011, together with Terese Erngaard, Andreas Rüedi, and Michael Roth.

== History ==
Roger Diener studied at the Swiss Federal Institute of Technology in Zurich (ETHZ) and later returned as a professor. He is one of the co-founders of Studio Basel, a practice-based architectural education outpost of ETHZ. Diener has also been a visiting professor at Harvard University Graduate School of Design, the School of Architecture in Vienna, Academie van Bouwkunst in Amsterdam and the Royal Danish Academy of Fine Arts in Copenhagen. Roger Diener has been a board member of the German Foundation for Monument Protection, Berlin, 2005 – 2013, and a member of the Swiss Federal Commission of historic monuments, 2013 – Awards: 2002 – Grande Médaille d’Or d’Architecture, Académie d’Architecture, Paris; 2009 – Prix Meret Oppenheim; 2010 – Prize of the German Architecture Museum (DAM) for Architecture in Germany; 2011 – Heinrich Tessenow Medal.

== Projects ==
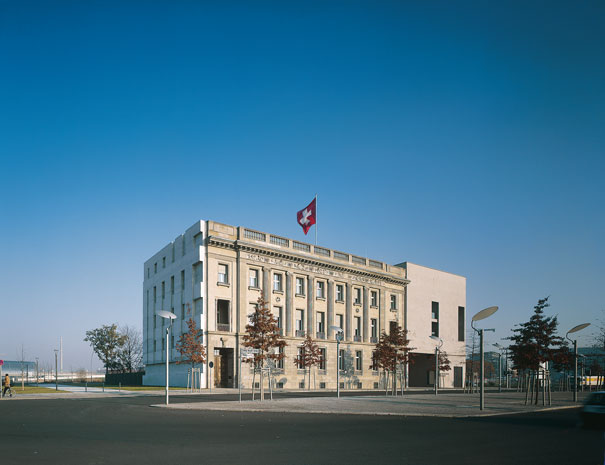
Swiss Embassy Berlin, Photo Christian Richters

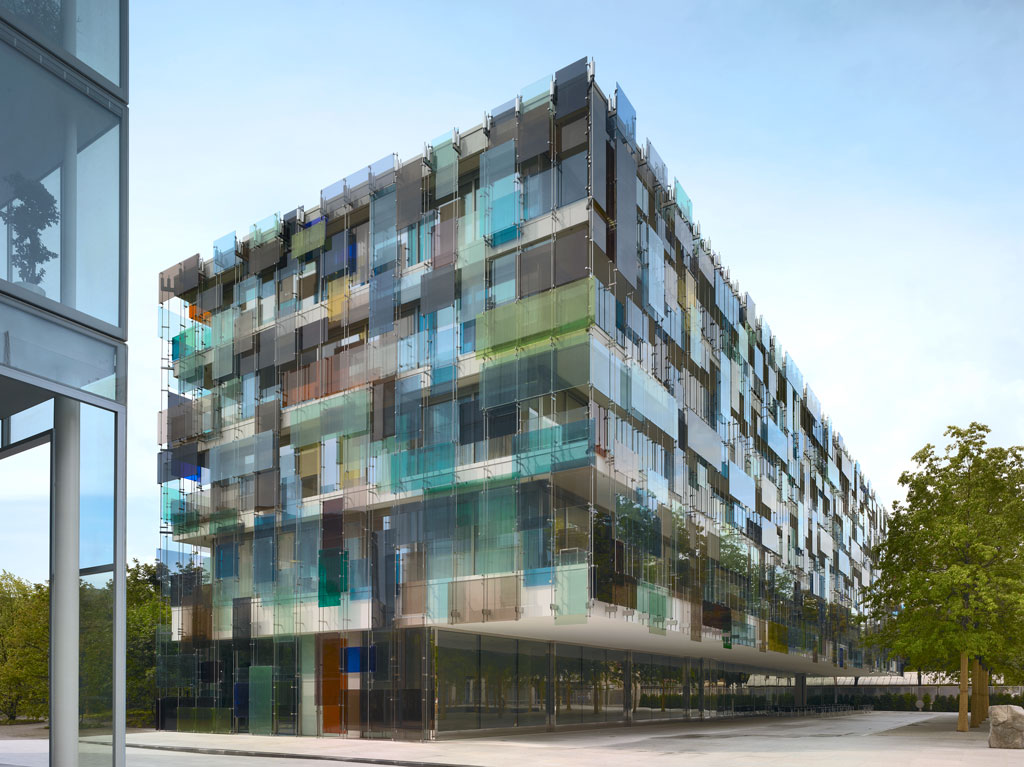
Novartis Campus Basel Forum 3, Photo Christian Richters

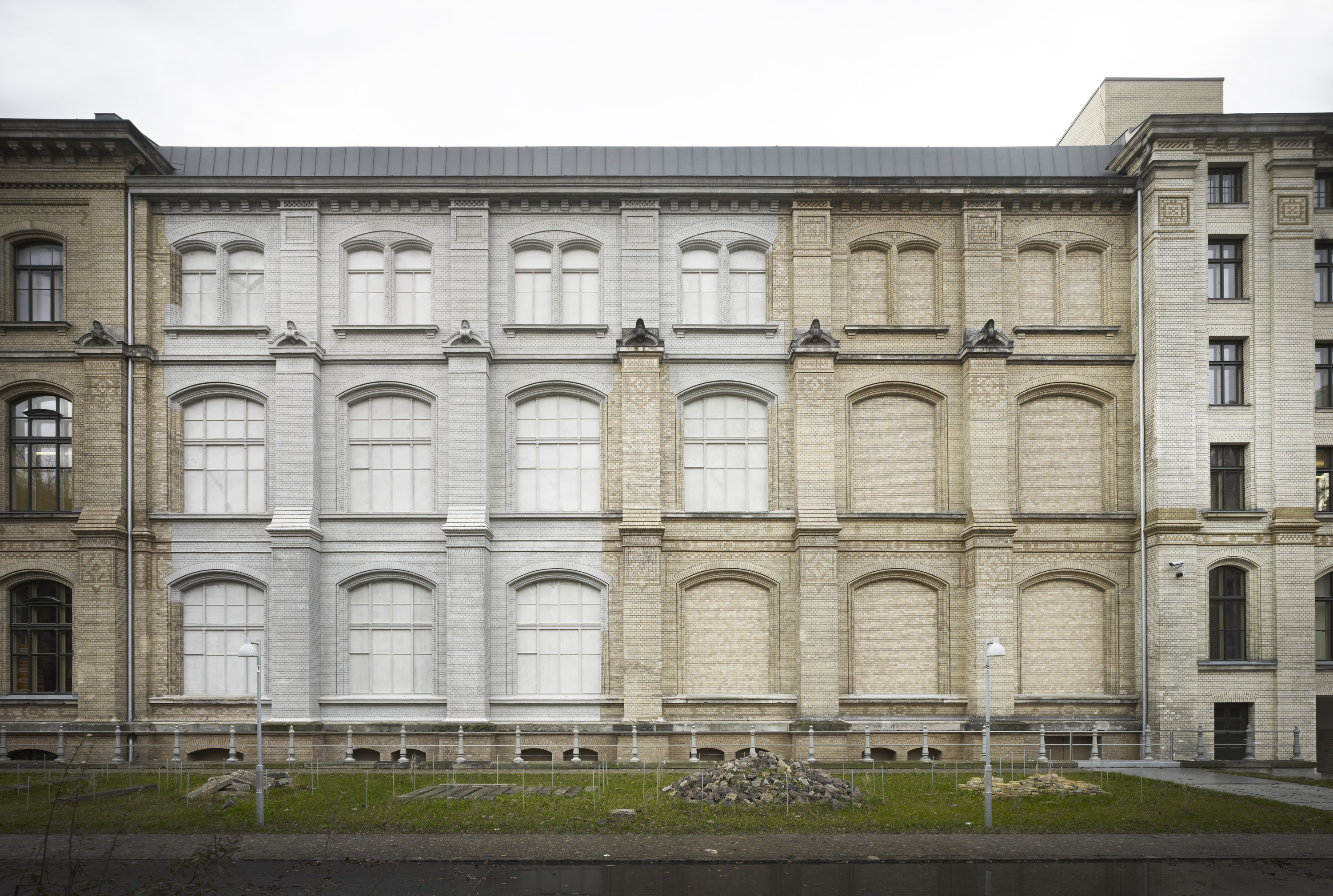
New East Wing Expansion of the Museum of Natural History, Berlin, Germany, 2005–2010, Photo Christian Richters

Apartment buildings, hotel, leisure

Hammerstrasse, Basel, Switzerland, 1978–1981; Riehenring, Basel, Switzerland, 1980–1985; Apartment Buildings St. Alban–Tal, Basel, Switzerland, 1981–1986; Roquette Residential Buildings, in collaboration with Dani Karavan, Paris, France, 1992–1996; Parkkolonnaden, Berlin, Germany, 1994–2000; KNSM- and Java–Island, Amsterdam, the Netherlands, 1995–2001; Office and Residential Buildings, ‘Quartier 110’, Berlin, Germany, 1996–2004; Row Houses Isteinerstrasse, In collaboration with August Künzel Landschaftsarchitekten, Basel, Switzerland, 1997–2003; Bäumleingasse, Basel, Switzerland, 1999–2005; Ypenburg, in collaboration with West 8, The Hague, The Netherlands, 2000–2003; Musterhaus, in collaboration with Architekt Krischanitz, Hadersdorf, Vienna, Austria, 2000–2007; Maag Residential Building, Zurich, Switzerland, 2002–2012; Mobimo Tower, Residential Building and Hotel, Zurich, Switzerland, 2002–2011; Casa A1 at the Olympic Village, with Steidle + Partner, Torino, Italy, 2003–2006; Westkaai 1 + 2 Apartment Buildings, in collaboration with Michel Desvigne Paysagiste, Antwerp, Belgium, 2005–2009; Apartment Building with daycare centre, Macrolot A2, in collaboration with Peter Suter, Boulogne–Billancourt, France, 2005–2009; Markthalle Basel Tower, Basel, Switzerland, 2007–2012; Apartment Buildings Champfèr, Champfèr, Switzerland, 2008–2013; House Rewers Rahbek, Falster, Denmark, 2009–2011;

Office buildings and retail

Office Building Steinentorberg, Basel, Switzerland, 1984–1990; Administration Building Hochstrasse, Basel, Switzerland, 1985–1988; Training and Conference Centre Viaduktstrasse, Basel, Switzerland, 1985–1994; Administration Building Picassoplatz, Basel, Switzerland, 1987–1993; Office Building Kohlenberg, Basel, Switzerland, 1992–1995; Housing and Office Buildings Warteck Brewery, in collaboration with Suter & Suter, Basel, Switzerland, 1992–1996; Hotel Schweizerhof, Migros, Supermarket, Migros School, Lucerne, Switzerland, 1995–2000; Swiss Embassy Berlin, Berlin, Germany, 1995–2000; ABB Power Tower Engineering Building, Baden, Switzerland, 1999–2002; Stuker Auction House, Berne, Switzerland, 2001–2003; Stücki Shopping Centre, Hotel, and Offices, Basel, Switzerland, 2001–2009; Showroom and Administration Building Slam Jam, Ferrara, Italy, 2002–2005; Novartis Campus Forum 3, in collaboration with artist Helmut, Federle, architect Gerold Wiederin, Basel, Switzerland, 2002–2005; House ‘C’ Office Building at Citygate, Basel, Switzerland, 2002–2010;

Museums, music halls, archives, educational buildings

Architecture Museum at Domus–Haus, Basel, Switzerland, 1984–1985; Gmurzynska Gallery, Cologne, Germany, 1988–1991; Vogesen School, Basel, Switzerland, 1992–1996; Extension to the ‘Centre Pasqu’Art’, Biel, Switzerland, 1995–1999; Presentation of the ‘Guest of Honour 1998 Switzerland’ at Frankfurt Book Fair, in collaboration with Peter Suter, Frankfurt am Main, Germany, 1998; Collection Rosengart, Lucerne, Switzerland, 1999–2002; Extension to the National Gallery of Modern Art, in collaboration with Peter Suter, Rome, Italy, 2000–; University Building, Malmö, Sweden, 2003–2005; Shoah Memorial Drancy, in collaboration with Eric Lapière, and J.L. Cohen, Drancy, France, 2006–2011; Music House for Instrumental Practice and Choral Rehearsal, Benedictine Monastery Einsiedeln, Switzerland, 2006–2010; Monastery Archive and Library, Benedictine Monastery Einsiedeln, Switzerland, 2008–2010; New East Wing Expansion of the Museum of Natural History, Berlin, Germany, 2005–2010;

Masterplans

Masterplan for Baden–Nord, in collaboration with Martin Steinmann. Baden, Switzerland, 1994–1998; Masterplan for the University Harbour PHASE 1, Malmö, Sweden, 1997; Masterplan for the Maag Areal Plus, in collaboration with Boesch Architects, Zurich, Switzerland, 2000; Masterplan for Citygate, in collaboration with August Künzel Landschaftsarchitekten, Basel, Switzerland, 2002–2010; Masterplan Droogdokkeneiland, Antwerp, Belgium, 2002; Masterplan for Residential and Office Buildings ‘Ile Seguin’, in collaboration with Vogt Landschaftsarchitekten, Boulogne-Billancourt, France, 2005–2009; Masterplan Sihl Manegg, Zurich, Switzerland, 2006–2010; Masterplan for Malters, in collaboration with August Künzel Landschaftsarchitekten, Malters, Switzerland, 2007; Masterplan Rosental Basel, Basel, Switzerland, 2008;

=== Exhibitions ===
Solo

From City to Detail, The Architecture Foundation, London, Aedes, Berlin, 1992–1993; The House and the city (Das Haus und die Stadt) Architekturgalerie Luzern, Lucerne, 1995 – 1998; Centralbahnplatz-Von der Drehscheibe zum Arboretum, S AM (Swiss Architecture Museum), Basel, 1997; Cityscapes (Stadtansichten), Eidgenössisch Technische Hochschule Zurich (ETHZ), Zurich, 2001; Dentro il Volume. Interior Volume, Spazio Espositivo di Santa Verdiana Facoltà di Architettura–Università di Firenze (SESV), Florence, 2003; Von innen und außen bewegt. Diener & Diener Architekturmuseum der Technischen Universität Munich in the Pinakothek der Moderne, Munich, 2004; Novartis-Campus - Forum 3. Diener, Federle, Wiederin S AM (Swiss Architecture Museum), Basel, 2005; The House and the city. Architecture by Diener & Diener. Tokyo Opera City Art Gallery (TOCAG), Tokyo, 2009; Carte Blanche VIII: Diener & Diener Architekten, Architekturforum Zurich, 2010/11;

Group

Architecture and Lego (Architektur und Lego), Rotterdam, 1984; Extension to the “Galleria d’Arte Moderna, Rome”, Project by Diener & Diener presented at the 8th International Architecture Exhibition la Biennale di Venezia. Next. Venice, 2002; “Common Pavilions”, Project presented by Diener & Diener at the 13th International Architecture Exhibition. Common Ground. Venice, 2012

== Projects in development ==
Renovation of the Museum of Natural History, Berlin, Germany, 1995–; Karlin Residential and Office Buildings, Prague, Czech Republic, 2006–; Extension of the Town Museum ‘Schlössli’, in collaboration with Martin Steinmann, and artist Josef Felix Müller, Aarau, Switzerland, 2007–; Laboratory Building Novartis Campus Shanghai, in collaboration with Sevil Peach Gence Associates, Shanghai, China, 2007–; Basel East “Bäumlihofpark“, in collaboration with August Künzel Landschaftsarchitekten, Basel, Switzerland, 2007–; Building for a Law Firm, Kirchberg, Luxembourg, 2007–; Residential Buildings Richti Wallisellen Zurich, Switzerland, 2008–; Swiss Re Next Headquarters. Zurich, Switzerland, 2008–; Masterplan for ‘Dräger’ Industrial Works, Lübeck, Germany, 2009–; Spa Le Domaine Abadia Retuerta, Spain, 2011–; Convention Centre–Zurich, Tonhalle Zurich Refurbishment, in collaboration with Boesch Architects, Zurich, Switzerland, 2015–;
