= Alberto Campo Baeza =

Spanish architect

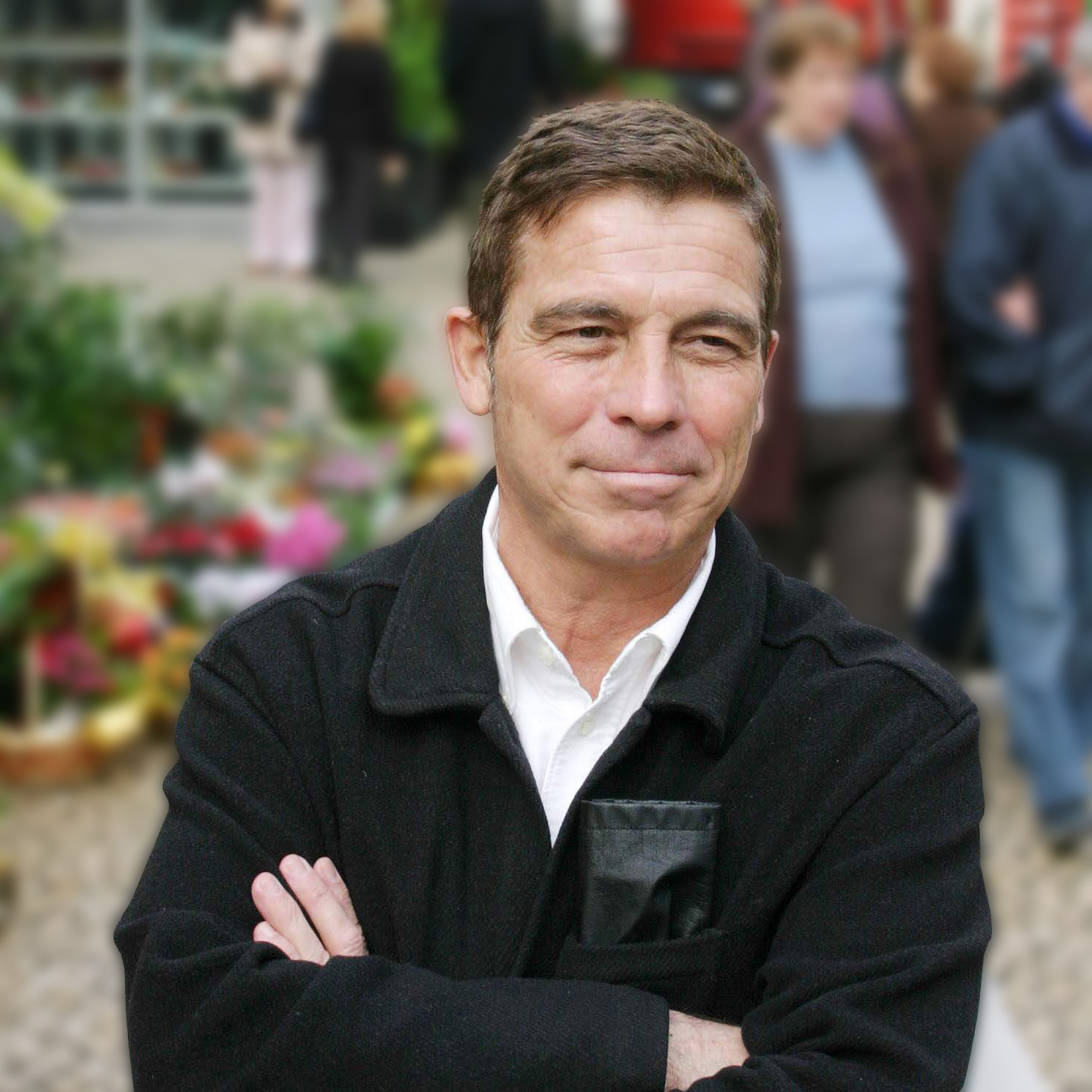
- Born: 1946 (age 79–80); Valladolid
- Occupation: Architect
- Awards: RIBA International Fellowship 2014, Arnold W. Brunner Memorial Prize 2013, Heinrich Tessenow Gold Medal 2013, International Award in Stone 2013, UPM Award for Excellence in Teaching 2012
- Practice: Estudio de Arquitectura Campo Baeza
- Buildings: Turégano House, De Blas House, Caja de Granada, Offices in Zamora

Alberto Campo Baeza (born in 1946, in Valladolid) is a Spanish architect and Full-Time Design Professor at the Escuela Técnica Superior de Arquitectura de Madrid from 1986 to 2017. He retired the same year. He has built several buildings that have received awards.

He has been noted by some as part of a group of designers associated with Minimalism in architecture, together with architects such as David Chipperfield and John Pawson. Campo advocates for a color-neutral approach to emphasize natural light.

== Biography ==
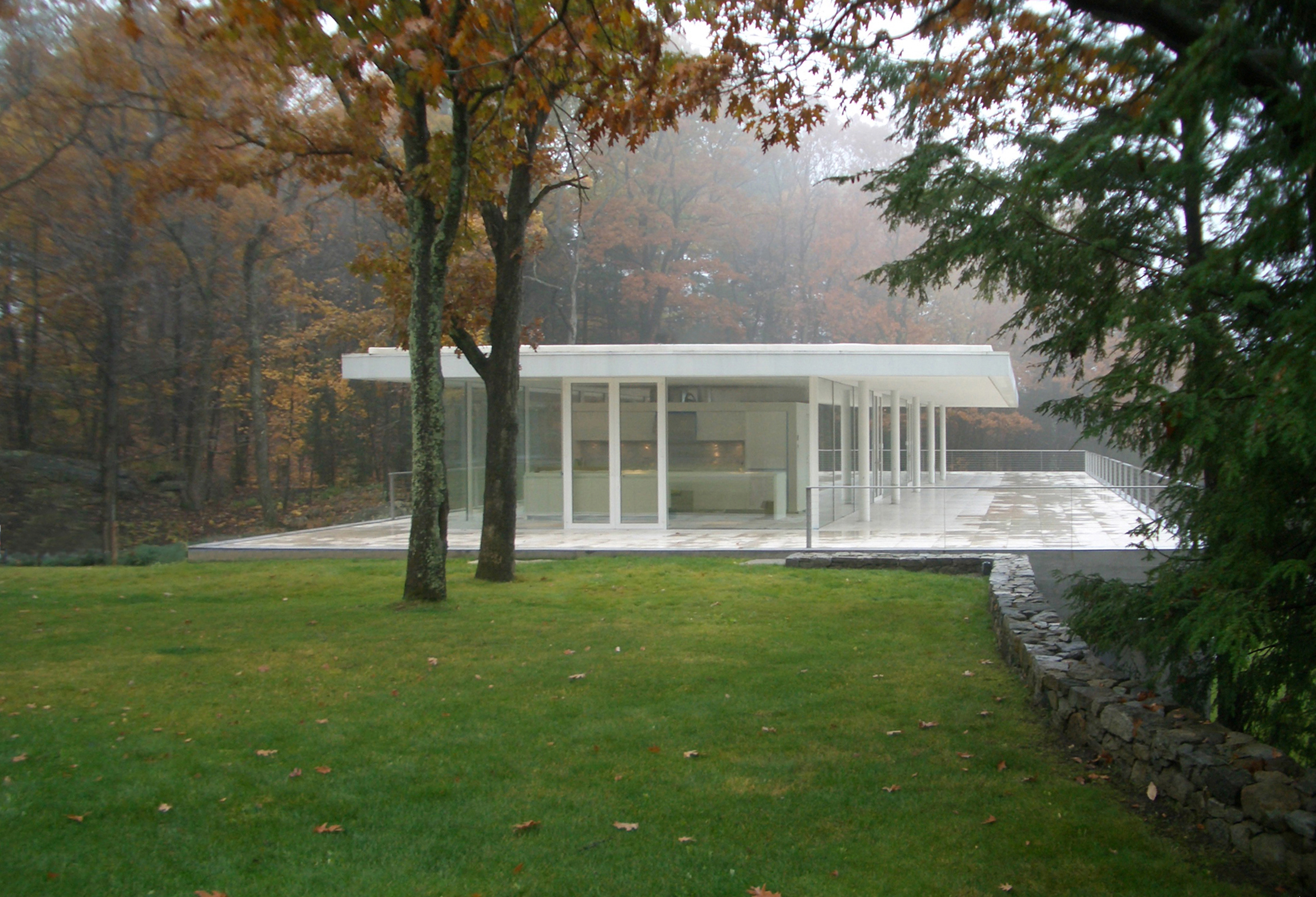
Exterior view of the Olnik Spanu House (New York) Photo: Miguel Quismondo

Alberto Campo graduated from the Universidad Politécnica de Madrid in 1971 and received his PhD in 1982.

Campo Baeza taught at ETH Zurich in 1989 and 1990; The Architecture Winter School in Dublin in 1992, Domus International Courses in Naples in 1993; and Virginia Tech in Blacksburg, Virginia; at The Royal Academy in Copenhagen in 1996; at the EPFL Ecole d’Architecture of Lausanne in 1997; the University of Pennsylvania in 1986 and 1999; the Bauhaus University in Weimar in 2002; the IIT in Chicago in 2003 and at Kansas State University in 2005. He had a visiting fellowship at Columbia University, New York, in 2003. He has given lectures at Harvard University, University of Miami and Columbia University in 2002; the IIT in Chicago in 2003; the Basilica Palladiana in Vicenza, in 2004; the CA Group in Beijing, Porto and Mendrisio in 2007; Katowice, Poland and Panama City in 2008; Monterrey Mexico, the Washington National Museum, and Tokyo University in 2009; Bergen and Weimar in 2010; Paris- Belleville and Aachen in 2011; in IUAV Venice and the Catholic University of America (Washington, DC) in 2012.

== Works ==
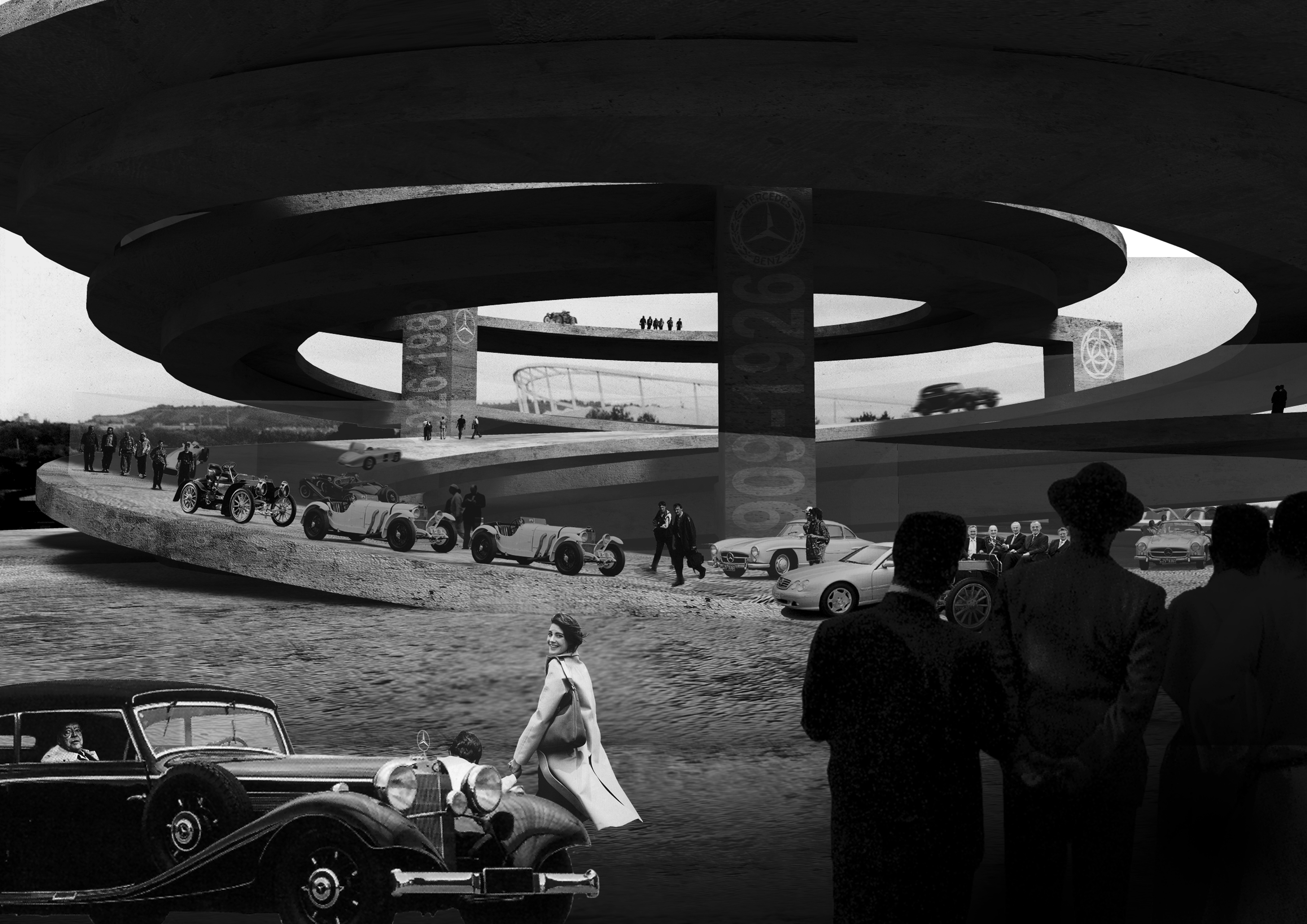
Mercedes-Benz Museum Render

His works are recognized in certain architectural circles. From the Houses Turégano and de Blas, both in Madrid, to Gaspar House, Asencio House, or Guerrero House in Cádiz, Rufo House in Toledo, and Moliner House in Zaragoza. And the Olnick Spanu House in Garrison, New York. Or the Centro BIT in Inca-Mallorca, the public space Between Cathedrals, in Cádiz, or the Caja de Granada Savings Bank and the MA, the Museum of Memory of Andalucía, both in Granada. And a nursery for Benetton in Venice. In 2012, he finished the construction of the Offices in Zamora for the Regional Government of Castilla y León. In 2014, the House of the Infinite (VT House) in Cádiz and in 2015 the Cala House in Madrid.

== Awards, publications, and exhibitions ==
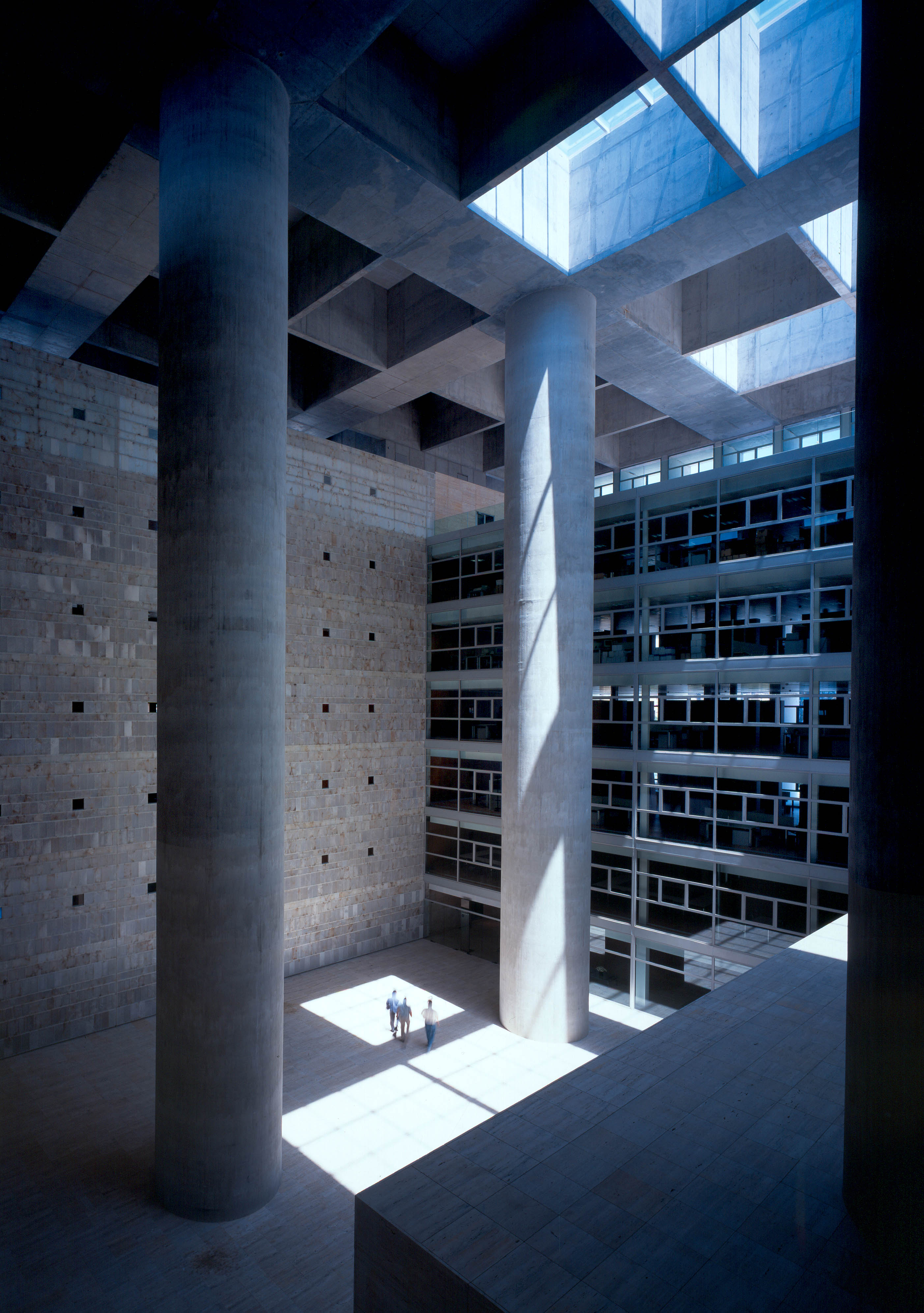
Interior of La Caja de Granada Headquarters. Photographer: Hisao Suzuki

The work of Alberto Campo Baeza has won numerous awards. He won first prize for the Spanish Pavilion at the Biennial of Venice in 2000; first prize at the Biennial of Miami in 2000; the COAM Award for the Blas House in 2002; the COAB Award and the COAAO Award for the Centre BIT in Mallorca in 2003; The Award of Architecture in Stone for the Almería Offices in Verona in 2003; and the Eduardo Torroja Award for the Headquarters of the Caja de Granada in 2005. Campo Baeza was the recipient of two awards at the Biennial of Buenos Aires, one for the MA Museum in Granada and the other for the Nursery for the children of the Benetton Group in Ponzano-Treviso, Italy, in 2009. In 2010, his work "Between Cathedrals" was a finalist in the FAD Awards. His MA Museum, in 2011, and the Offices for the Junta Castilla y León, in 2012, have been nominated to the Mies van der Rohe Award. In 2013 Campo Baeza was awarded the Arnold W. Brunner Memorial Prize of the American Academy of Arts and Letters, the Heinrich Tessenow Gold Medal of Hamburg University, the UPM (Polytechnic University of Madrid) Award for Excellence in Teaching., and the RIBA International Fellowship 2014 of the Royal Institute of British Architects. Also in 2014, he was elected a Full Member of the Royal Academy of Fine Arts of San Fernando of Spain. In 2024, Alberto Campo Baeza received The Daylight Award for Daylight in Architecture.

A book of his collected writings, La idea Construida, is in its 10th edition, and a monograph of his work, "Campo Baeza 1971-1996", was published in Spain by Ed. Munilla Lería, Madrid in 1996. "Campo Baeza" was published by Rockport Publishers, Massachusetts, and Graphic-Sha Publishers, Tokyo in 1997. The English edition of the monograph “Alberto Campo Baeza” was published by Gustavo Gili Publisher, Barcelona, 1999, and translated into Italian by Edizioni Electa, Milano in 2004. A DVD with 3,333 drawings and sketches was edited by Fundación COAM for the Exhibition of the work of Alberto Campo Baeza in 2006. A newer version of the same DVD, including the recent drawings by Alberto Campo Baeza, was also published by Fundación COAM in 2008. In 2009, Campo Baeza 2, Munilla Lería Publisher, was published in Madrid. Alberto Campo Baeza, Idea, Light and Gravity was published in Japanese and English by TOTO Publishers in Tokyo. In 2009, “Pensar con Las Manos”, and in 2012, the new collection of his writings Principia Architectonica.

Campo Baeza's work has been exhibited in many major cities, and he has been published in major architectural magazines around the world. In 2003, an exhibition of his work took place at the Crown Hall at the IIT in Chicago, organized by the Spanish Instituto Cervantes. The same exhibition was shown later in the fall of 2003 at the Urban Center in New York City. A selection of his work was exhibited at the Basilica del Palladio in Vicenza, Italy, in 2004. The same exhibition was shown in Istanbul, at the Hadja Irene in 2005. The MA Memory of Andalucía Museum in Granada, then just under construction, was exhibited at MoMA in New York in 2006. The Exhibition “Alberto Campo Baeza: The Complete Collection of Drawings” was shown at the COAM Foundation in Madrid in 2006. The Exhibition “On Site” was at the Royal Botanic Garden in Madrid in 2007. A retrospective of his work was shown in June–October 2009 in Tokyo at the MA Gallery. And in 2010 the National Glyptoteque in Athens, the Tempietto de San Pietro in Montorio in Rome, and the Salón de Reinos in Madrid. In 2011, his work was exhibited in the Central House of Artists in Moscow and in the MAXXI in Rome. In 2012, he designed a little pavilion at the Venice Biennale. In 2013, his work was exhibited at the American Academy of Arts and Letters in New York and at the Pibamarmi Foundation in Vicenza.

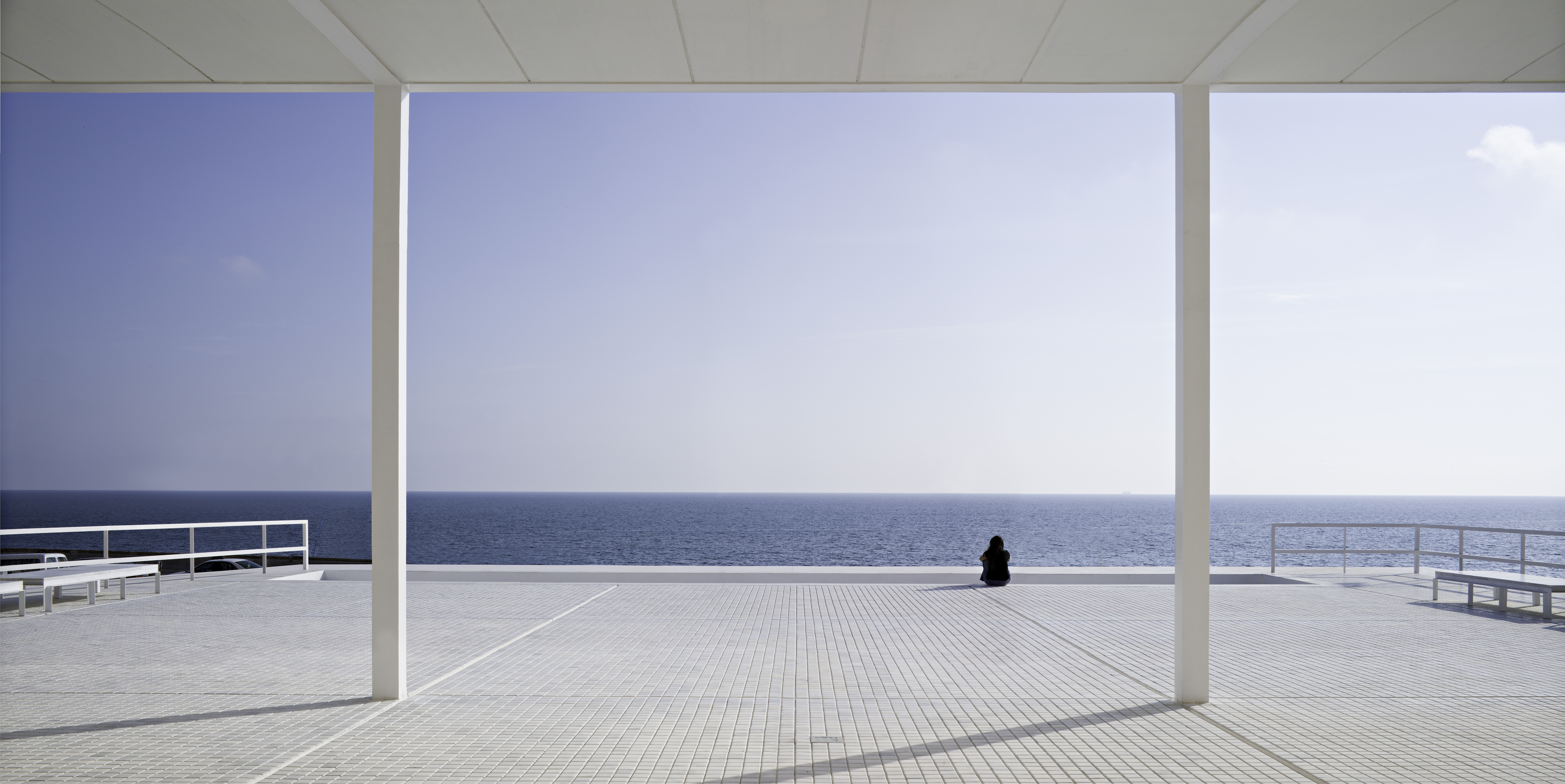
Between Cathedrals. View of the sea over the platform. Photographer: Javier Callejas

== Selected work ==
- 2014 House of the Infinite (VT House), Cádiz, Spain
- 2012 Offices for the Junta de Castilla y León, Zamora, Spain
- 2009 Rufo House, Toledo, Spain
- 2009 Between Cathedrals, Cádiz, Spain
- 2009 MA Museum, Granada, Spain
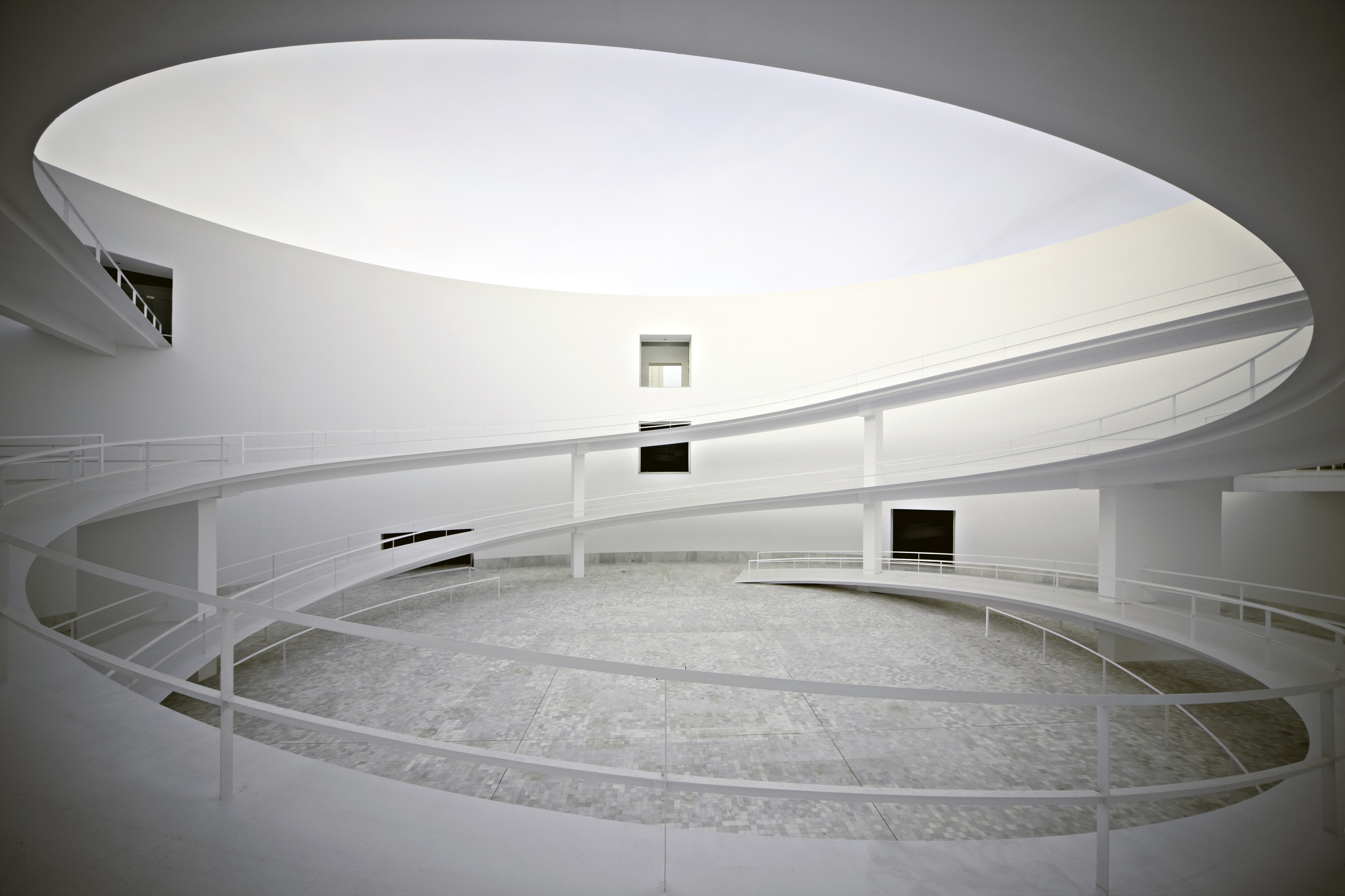
  View of the ramp of the MA Museum. Photographer: Javier Callejas
- 2008 Olnik Spanu House, Garrison, New York, United States
- 2008 Moliner House, Zaragoza, Spain
- 2007 Nursery for the children of the Benetton Group, Treviso, Italy
- 2005 Guerrero House, Vejer de la Frontera, Cádiz, Spain
- 2003 SM group Headquarters, Boadilla del Monte, Madrid, Spain
- 2001 La Caja de Ahorros de Granada Headquarters, Granada, Spain
- 2000 De Blas House , Sevilla la Nueva (Madrid), Spain See on Map
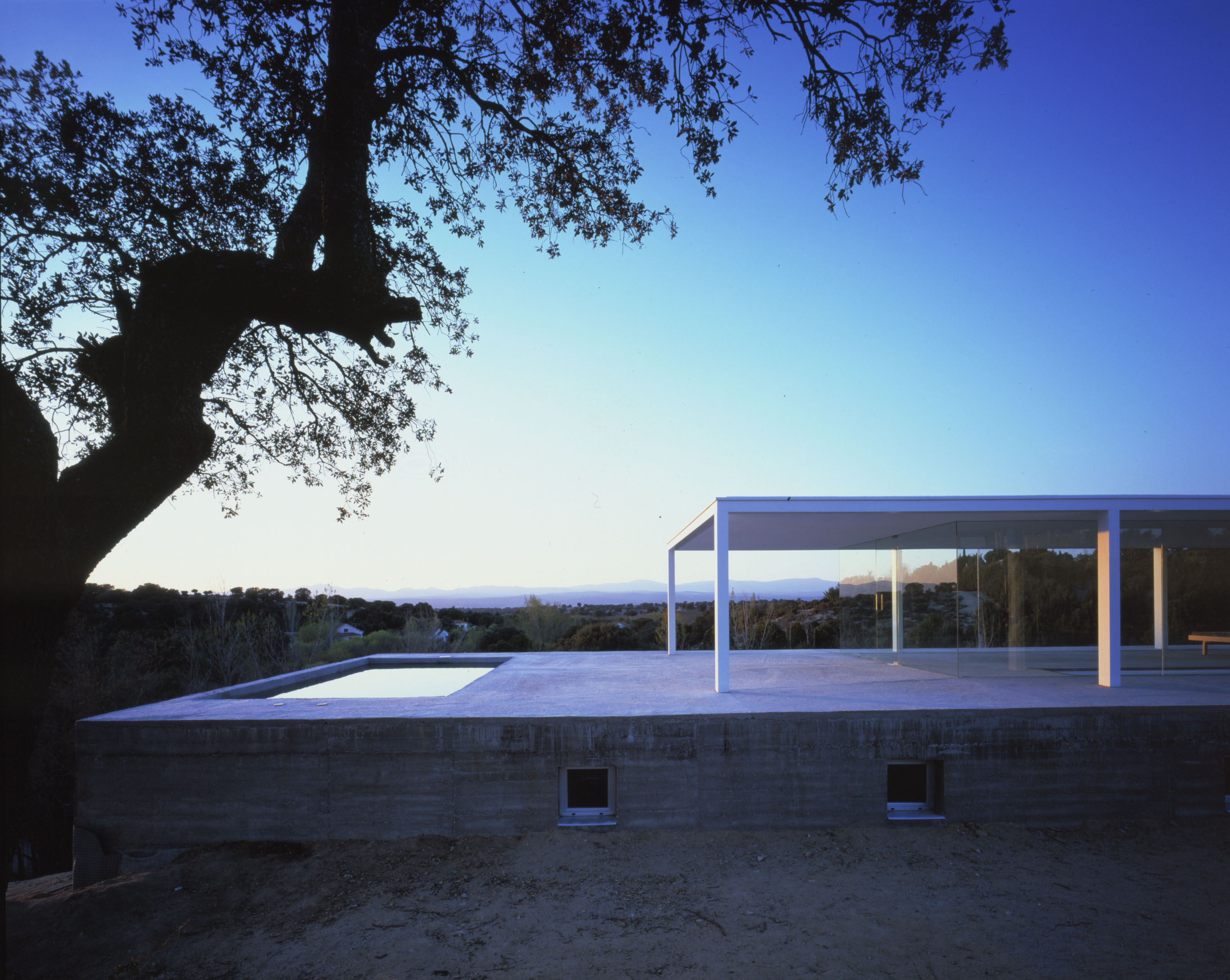
  Exterior view of the glass box of De Blas House. Photographer: Hisao Suzuki
- 1998 BIT Center, Inca, Mallorca, Spain
- 1992 Gaspar House, Vejer de la Frontera, Cádiz, Spain
- 1988 Turégano House, Pozuelo de Alarcón, Madrid, Spain See on Map

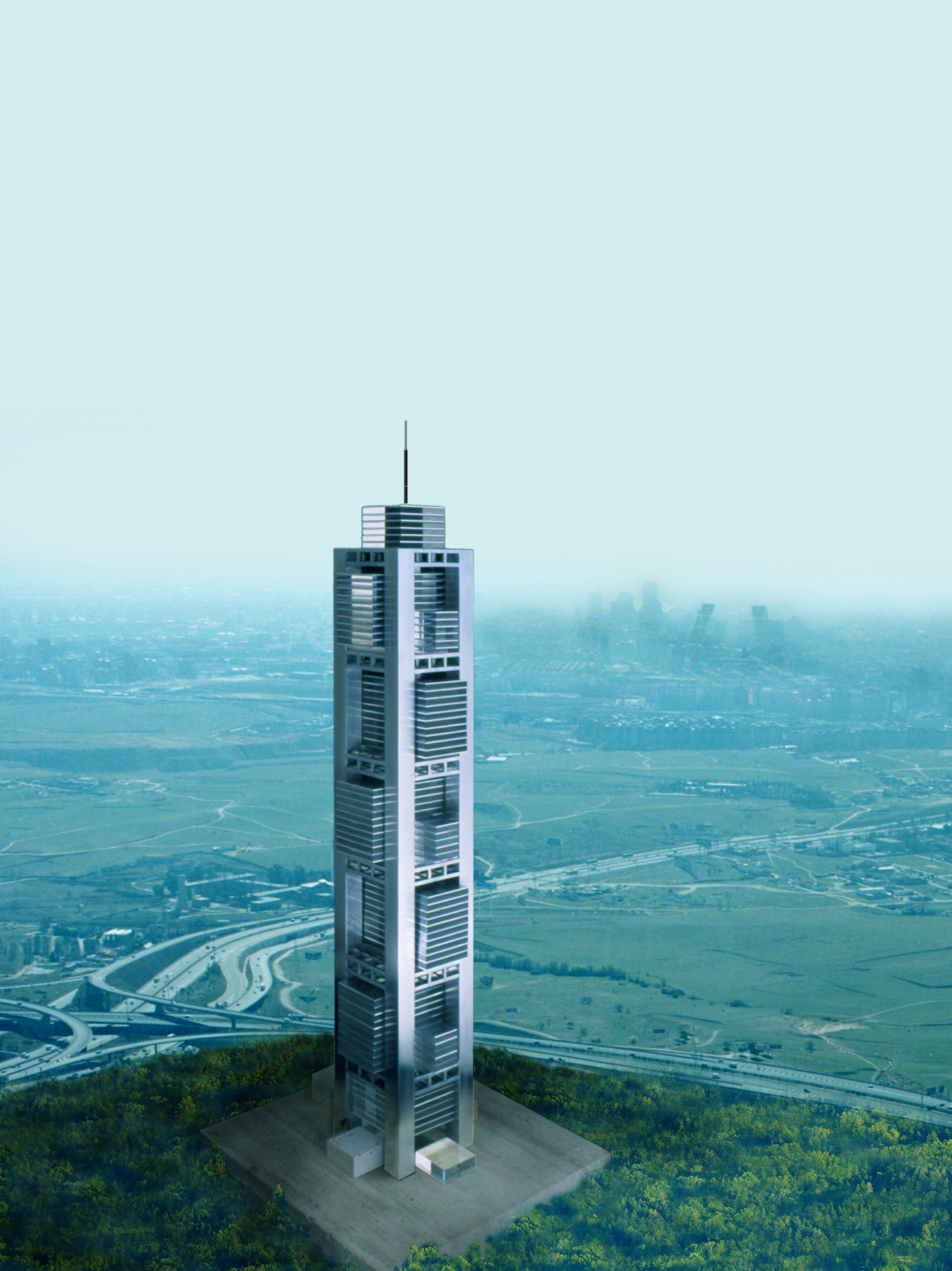
Telefónica Tower Render
