= Steen Eiler Rasmussen =

American architect

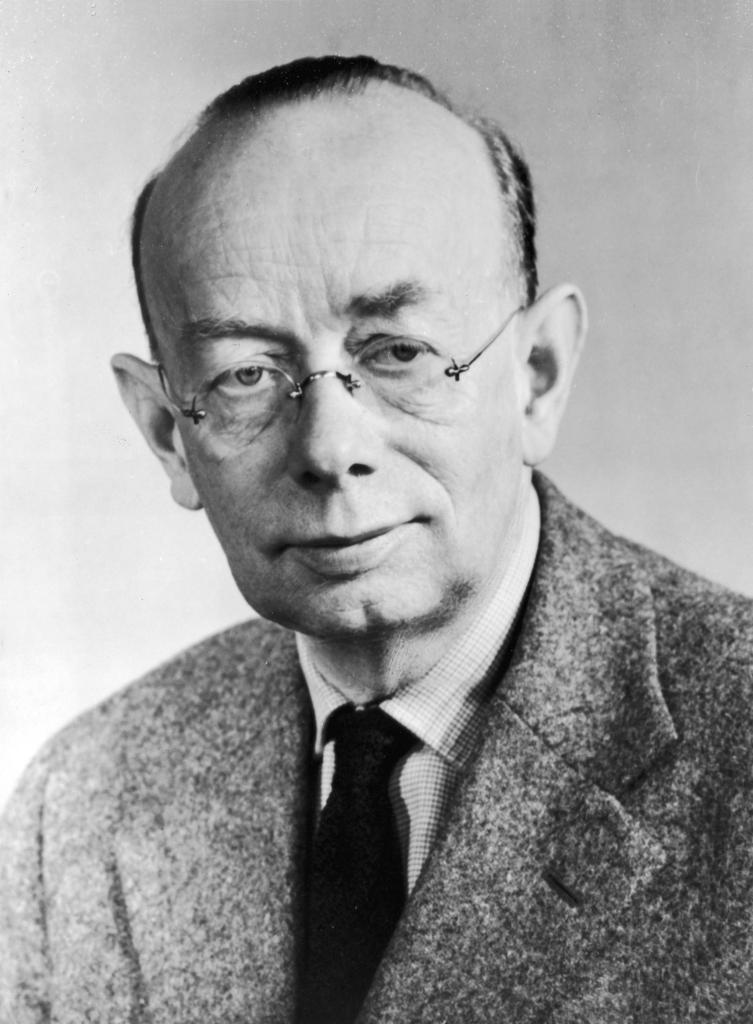
- Born: 9 January 1898; Copenhagen, Denmark
- Died: 19 June 1990 (aged 92); Copenhagen, Denmark
- Occupation: Architect
- Awards: Honorary Royal Designer for Industry (1947); Heinrich Tessenow Medal (1973); C. F. Hansen Medal (1977)
- Buildings: Tingbjerg

Steen Eiler Rasmussen, Hon. FAIA (9 January 1898 – 19 June 1990) was a Danish architect and urban planner who was a professor at the Royal Danish Academy of Fine Arts, and a prolific writer of books and poetry. He was made a Royal Designer for Industry by the British Royal Society of Arts in 1947.

== Early life and education ==
Steen Eiler Rasmussen was born on 19 February 1898 in Copenhagen to Lieutenant colonel and later general Christian Rasmussen and Anna Dorthea (Dori) Jung. He first apprenticed as a mason and then studied architecture at the Royal Danish Academy of Fine Arts from 1916 to 1918. In 1919 he set up his own practice.

== Architecture and urban planning ==
It was mainly as an urban planner that he made his name. He was part of the Danish Urban Planning Laboratory from 1924, as the Academy Council's representative, and its leader from 1942 to 1948. From 1932 to 1938 he worked at Copenhagen Municipality's Department for Urban Planning.

Through his involvement in the Urban Planning Laboratory, he was an important part of the process which led to the Finger Plan which has governed the overall development of suburban Copenhagen ever since. He also co-planned the area Tingbjerg town (yellow brickstone and greens) with C.Th. Sørensen in Copenhagen North West, as well as the town Hørsholm.

Among the buildings he has designed are Ringsted Town Hall, Mødrehjælpen (a social institution for women) in Copenhagen Ø and his own house in Rungsted Kyst Hørsholm, north of Copenhagen(1938).

== Academia ==
Rasmussen was a lecturer at the Academy from 1924 and became a professor in 1936. Among his students were Jørn Utzon, designer of the Sydney Opera House, and Marian Pepler who designed rugs for Gordon Russell in the 1930s .

== Writings ==
One of Rasmussen's most influential books was Experiencing Architecture, first published in Danish in 1957 and in English in 1959. Underlining the importance of a first-person, embodied experience of architecture - including its shape, color, scale, proportion, rhythm, textural effects, daylight and sound - the book may be regarded as a classic in architectural phenomenology.

Another important book was London. It was first published in Danish in 1934, in English (as London, the Unique City) in 1937. When this edition was re-issued in 1948, Rasmussen had added two Postscripts: "For English readers only", and "For American readers only". A shorter version was published as a paperback in 1960.

Other influential books by Rasmussen include Towns and Buildings (1951) and København (1969).

Among his many friends was Edmund N. Bacon.

== Personal life ==
On 15 June 1934 he married Karen Margrethe Schrøder (12 November 1904 - 31 March 1985), daughter of economist and later Danish National Bank manager Frederik Carl Gram Schrøder og Astrid Koefoed. He is the father of the linguist Una Canger. He was a close friend of the author Karen Blixen.

== Awards and distinctions ==
- 1947 Honorary Royal Designer for Industry, London
- 1973 Heinrich Tessenow Medal
- 1977 C. F. Hansen Medal

== Written works ==
- London, the Unique City (1937)
- Towns and Buildings (1951)
- Experiencing Architecture (1959).
