= Richti Wallisellen =

Mixed-use development in Wallisellen, Switzerland

Coordinates: 47.408901°N 8.59509°E

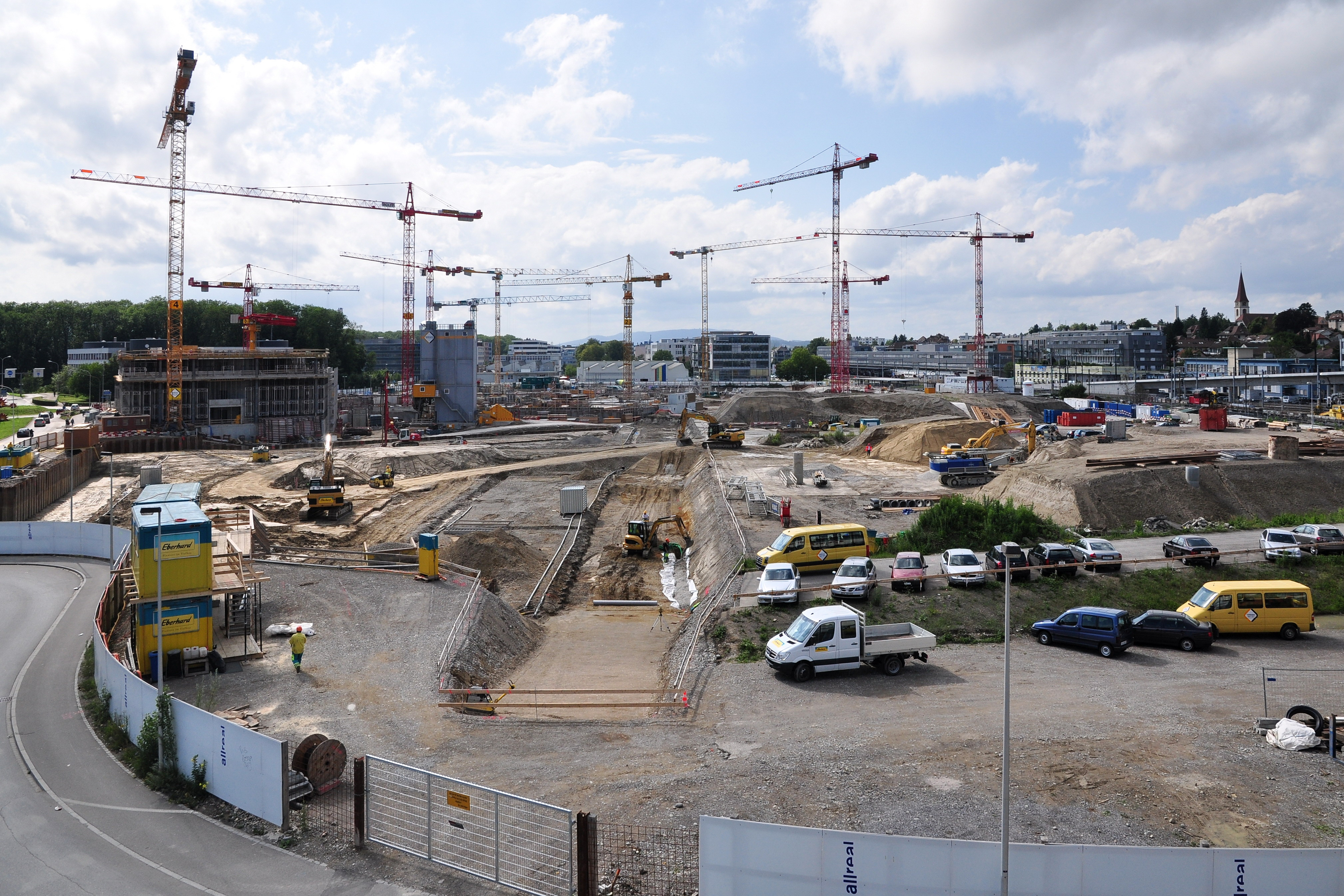
Richti Allreal Wallisellen - ex industrial area

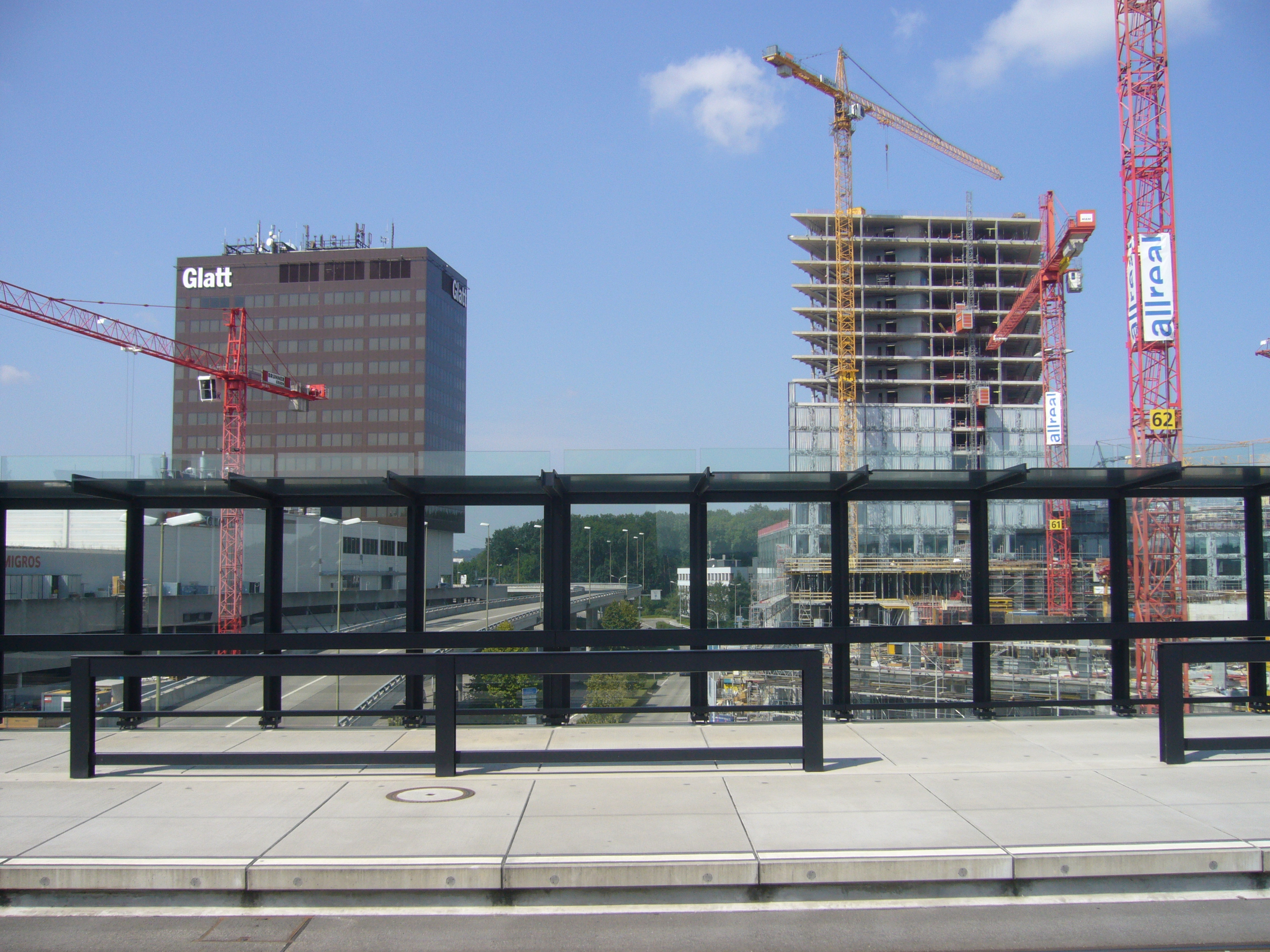
GlattTower & Allianz tower

Richti Wallisellen is a mixed-use development (residential, commercial, offices) on former industrial land situated between Wallisellen railway station and the 1970s-era Glattzentrum indoor shopping mall.

The master plan of the new complex was designed by architect Vittorio Magnago Lampugnani on a model of an Italian city center.

Richti Wallisellen is made of six five-storey high buildings and one 72-meter-high glass high-rise.

Four buildings are for residential purpose. The first two, already inhabited, host private apartments and are respectively designed by Vittorio Magnago Lampugnani (Konradhof) and SAM Architekten (Escherhof). The second two host apartments for rent, and are both designed by Diener & Diener.

The remaining two buildings are for offices. The first office building hosts the new headquarters of Allianz Suisse from the end of 2013 and is designed by Wiel Arets Architects. It is a technologically advanced complex composed of two glass buildings connected by bridges and has attracted considerable attention. The second office building hosts the new headquarters of UPC Cablecom from the end of 2014 and is designed by Max Dudler Architekten..

The complex has several public gardens with recreational areas for kids and a small Japanese garden in the internal court of the Allianz low building. All gardens are for public use, and open to public.

The Richtiarkade is the main artery of the complex, and has Richtiplatz at its center.

== Buildings ==
#	Name	Scope	Architect Studio	Date of completion
1	-	Allianz Suisse HQ, Richti Shopping on ground floor	Wiel Arets Architects, Maastricht + Amsterdam	2013
2	Konradhof	Residential, Richti Shopping on ground floor	Vittorio Magnago Lampugnani, Mailand	2013
3	Escherhof	Residential, Richti Shopping on ground floor	SAM Architekten und Partner AG, Zürich	2013
4	Favrehof	Residential, Richti Shopping on ground floor	Diener & Diener, Basel + Berlin	2014
5	Ringhof	Residential, Richti Shopping on ground floor, Offices on the East side	Diener & Diener, Basel + Berlin	2014
6	Richtiring	UPC Cablecom HQ, Richti Shopping on ground floor	Max Dudler Architekt, Berlin + Zürich	2014
7	-	Allianz Suisse	Wiel Arets Architects, Maastricht + Amsterdam	2013

== Richti Shopping ==
On the ground floor of the Richti Wallisellen - along the Richtiarkade - there are stores and services.

Most of the stores focus on food, services and fashion.

The main food court is at the center of the open-air complex on Richtiplatz.

== Richtiplatz ==
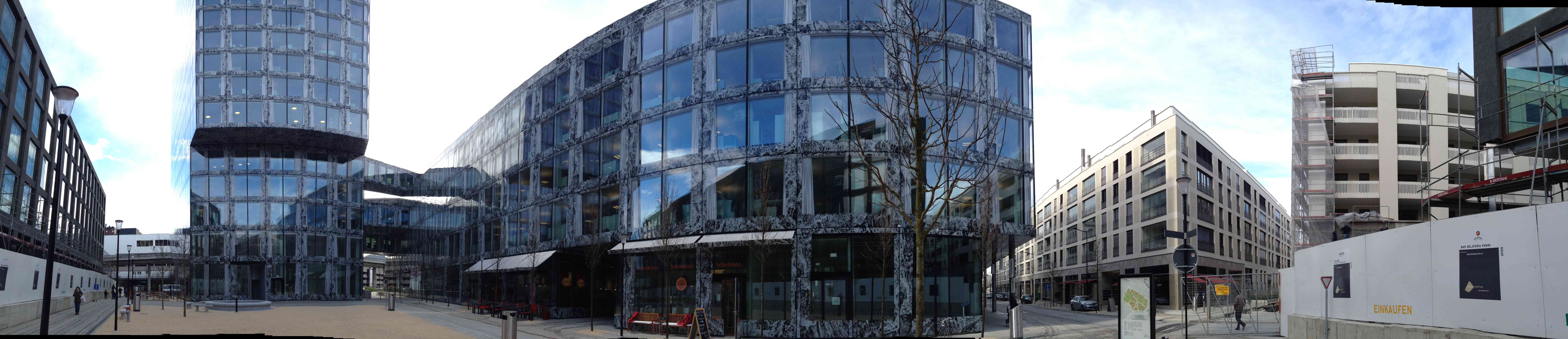

It's the center of Richti shopping. Here is a fountain, public benches, and several food businesses.

Andulino is an Italian restaurant specializing on pizza and grill.

Nooch is an Asian restaurant, specializing on Chinese and Thai food. It also incorporates Negishi, which offers Japanese specialities.

Sahar is a high-end Indian restaurant.

Schokolato is a gourmet Italian BAR GELATERIA, specializing in coffee, ice-cream/gelato and small lunch.

Zapote is Mexican-Californian restaurant, specializing on salads and burritos.
