= Triennale di Milano =

Cultural organization and museum in Italy

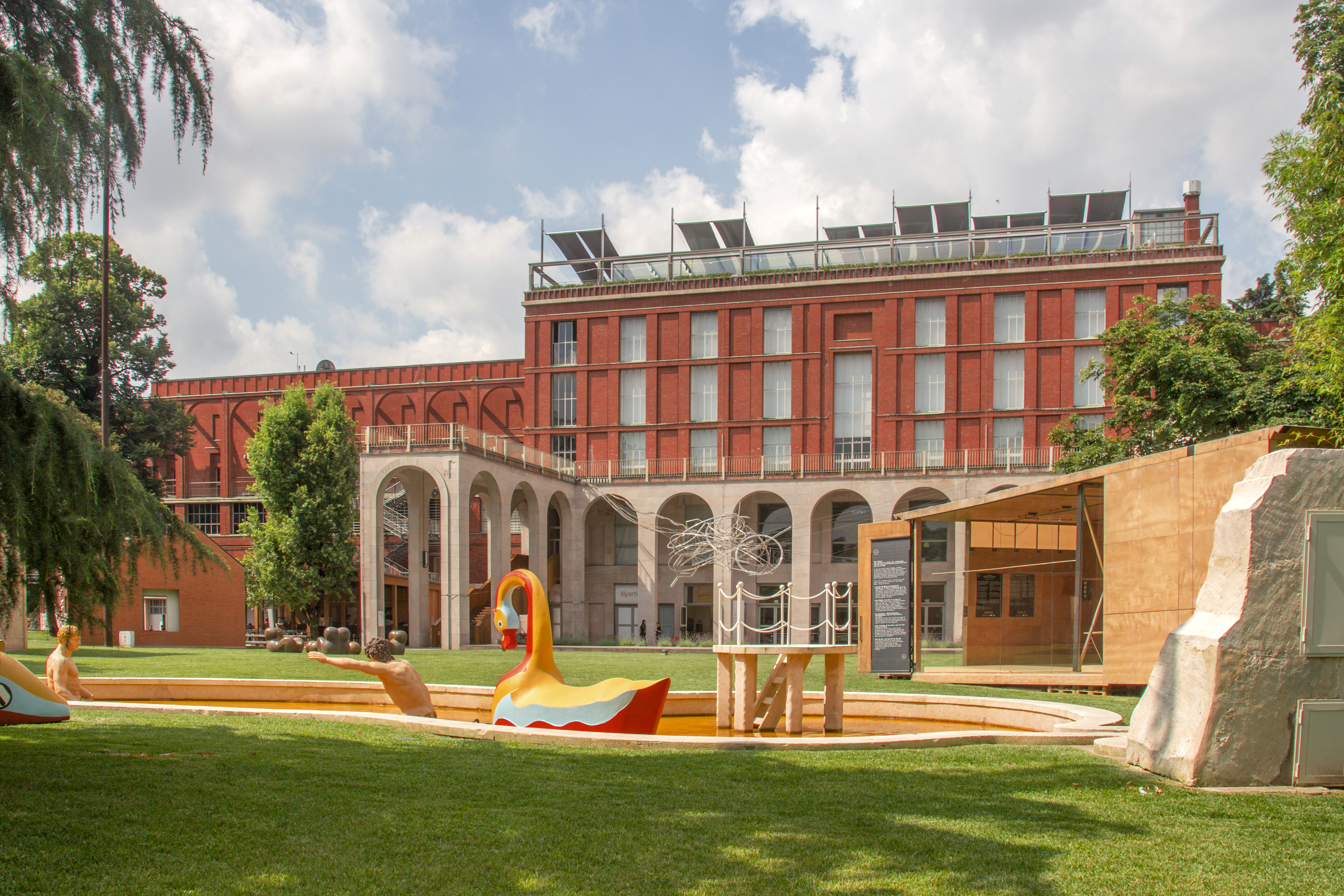
- Established: 1923
- Location: Viale Alemagna 6, 20121, Milan, Italy
- Coordinates: 45.4724°N 9.174°E
- Collections: Twentieth-century art
- Director: Carla Morogallo (director general)
- President: Vincenzo Trione
- Website: triennale.org

The Triennale di Milano is a museum of art and design in the Parco Sempione in Milan, in Lombardy in northern Italy. It is housed in the Palazzo dell'Arte, built between 1931 and 1933 to designs by Giovanni Muzio and financed by Antonio Bernocchi and his brothers Andrea and Michele. The building houses a theatre, the Teatro dell'Arte, which was also designed by Muzio.

The institution began in 1923 as an international exhibition of decorative arts held in Monza; it moved to Milan and became an independent legal entity in 1933, with the Palazzo dell'Arte as its headquarters. It is run by the Fondazione La Triennale di Milano, whose board elected Vincenzo Trione as president in June 2026, with Carla Morogallo confirmed as director general.

An international exhibition of art and design, the Milan Triennial, was held at the museum thirteen times between 1936 and 1996, and again in 2016.

Since 2003 the Triennale has awarded the triennial Gold Medal for Italian Architecture or Medaglia d'oro all'architettura italiana; Umberto Riva, Renzo Piano, Massimiliano Fuksas, Vincenzo Latina and Massimo Carmassi have been among the recipients.

A permanent museum of Italian design, the Triennale Design Museum, was opened in 2007. In July 2026 the designer Michele De Lucchi was named the Triennale's first creative director and head of the Museo del Design Italiano.

== See also ==
- List of design museums
