= Wilhelm Hübotter =

German architect

- Born: 16 June 1895; Amt Neuhaus, Germany
- Died: 28 July 1976 (aged 81); Hanover, Germany
- Occupation: Architect

Wilhelm Hübotter (16 June 1895 – 28 July 1976) was a German architect. His work was part of the architecture event in the art competition at the 1932 Summer Olympics.
