= Giorgio Grassi =

Italian architect

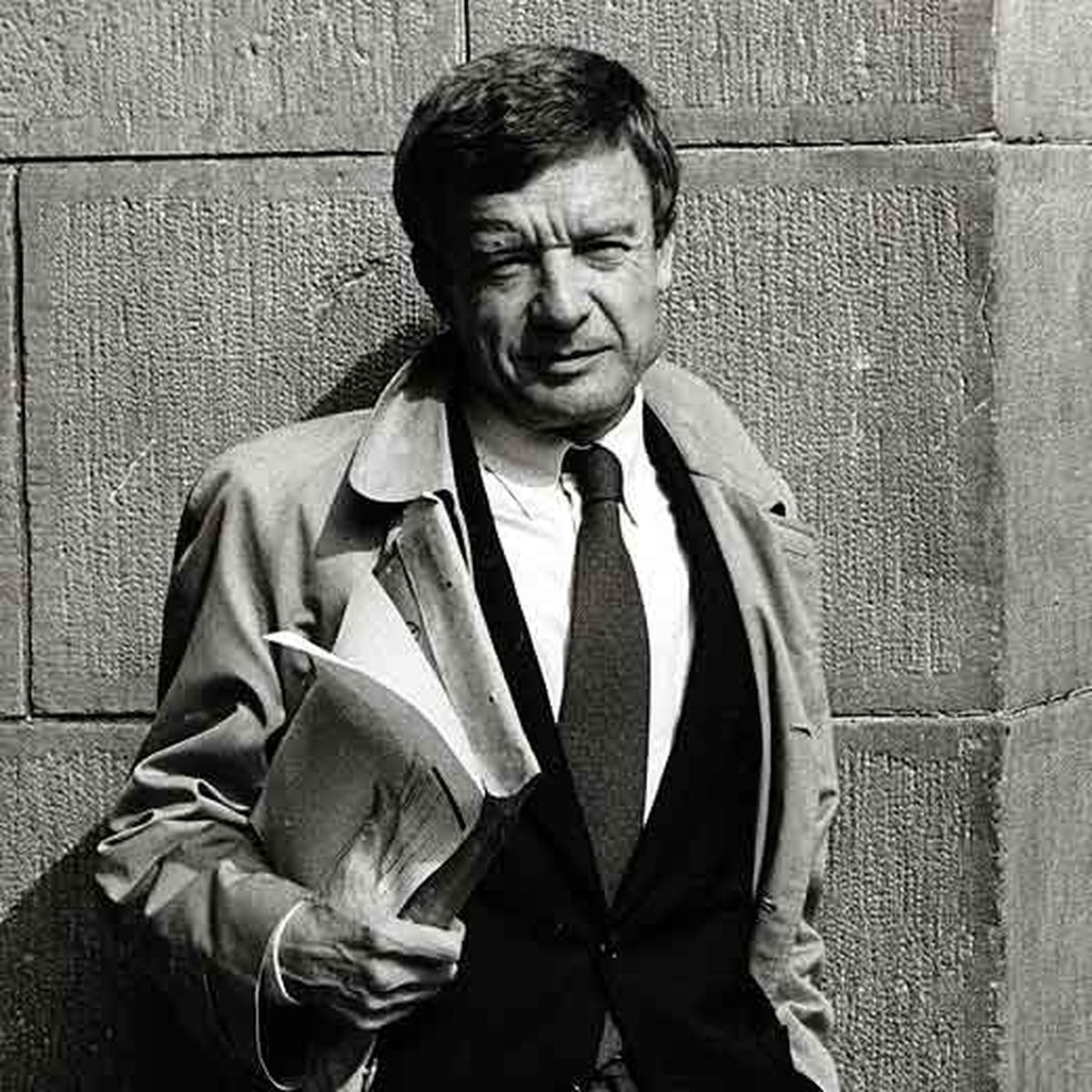
- Born: 27 October 1935 (age 90); Milan, Kingdom of Italy
- Education: Politecnico di Milano
- Occupation: Architect
- Practice: Italian rationalist school

Giorgio Grassi (born 27 October 1935) is one of Italy's most important modern architects, and part of the so-called Italian rationalist school, also known as La Tendenza, associated most famously with Carlo Aymonino and Aldo Rossi that emerged in Italy in the 1960s. Much influenced by Ludwig Hilberseimer, Heinrich Tessenow and Adolf Loos, Grassi's architecture is the most severely rational of the group: his extremely formal work is predicated on absolute simplicity, clarity, and honesty without ingratiation, rhetoric, or spectacular shape-making; it refers to historical archetypes of form and space and has a strong concern with the making of urban space. For these reasons, Grassi is a non-conformist and a critic of conventional mainstream architecture.

== Career ==
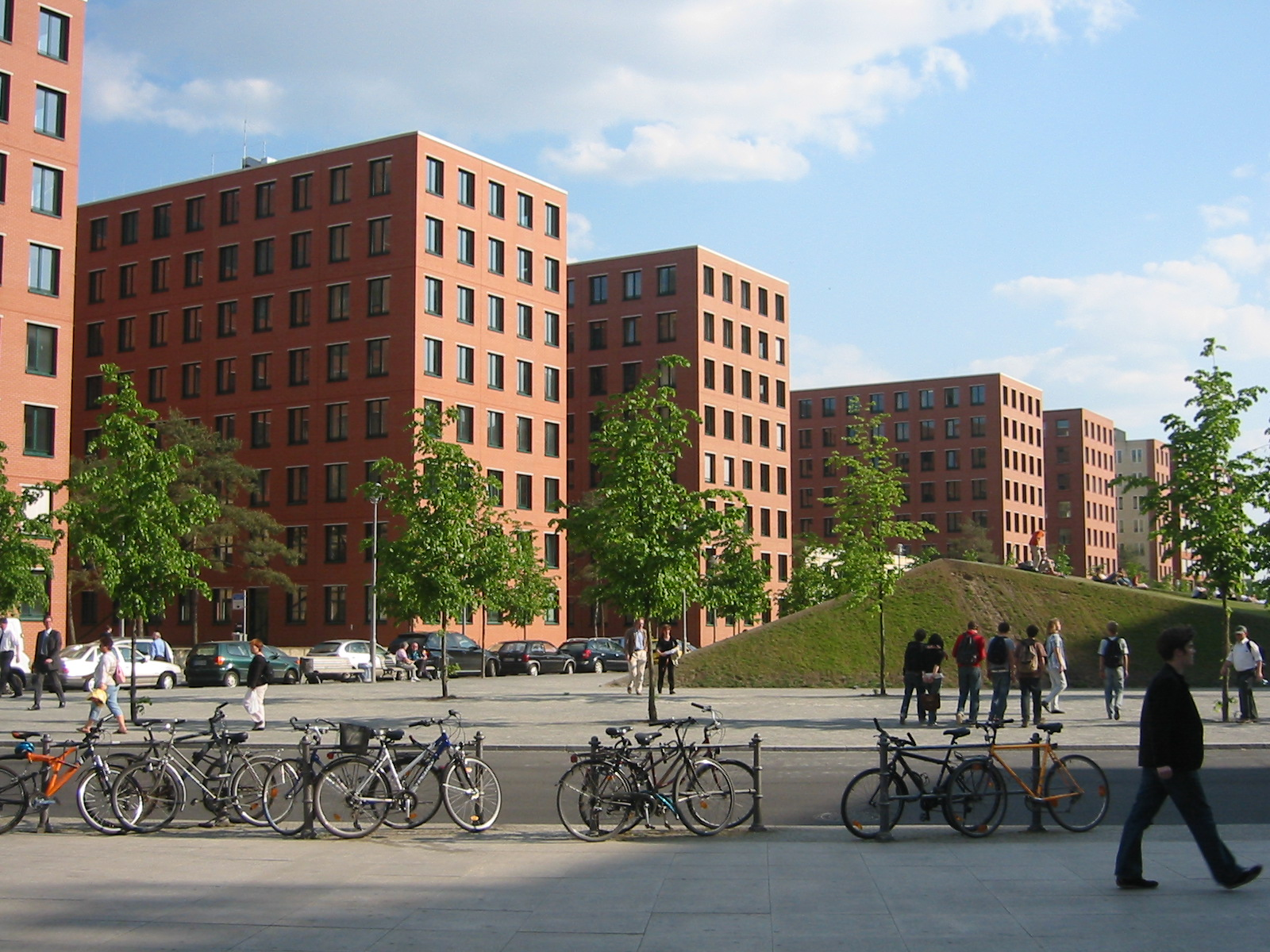
Building complex at Potsdamer Platz, Berlin (1993).

Grassi was born in Milan, Italy. He studied architecture at the Politecnico di Milano university, where he graduated in 1960. He worked for the magazine Casabella-continuità for 3 years until 1964 and has been professor at the Politecnico di Milano and other universities since 1965. Grassi is a prolific writer and theorist, having most notably written The Logical Construction of Architecture (1967), Architecture as a Craft (1979) and other influential works. Together with Aldo Rossi, Grassi argued that architecture had to look within itself to an autonomous methodology, separate from political, economic, social and technological events.

Though described as severely rational, Grassi's architecture also incorporates a sensitivity to classical and neo-classical architecture (Alberti, Schinkel), but is at the same time deeply influenced by the modern movement, especially in Germany and Austria. Grassi's trademarks are his use of exposed brick in most of his buildings as well as square windows. In his writings, he refers to the socialist German architects of the 1920s, as well as references to selected public buildings and public spaces as his guidelines. His works have been extensively published in the top international architecture magazines. The work of Marxist architectural historian Manfredo Tafuri also influenced Grassi and the La Tendenza movement, and the University Iuav of Venice emerged as a centre of the group after Tafuri became chair of Architecture History in 1968. A Tendenza exhibition was organized for the 1973 Milan Triennale.

In 1994, a competition was organised for the refurbishment of one of the key monuments of Berlin, Friedrich August Stüler’s Neues Museum (New Museum), completed in 1855. Entrants to the competition were asked to address the building’s refurbishment in tandem with developing a masterplan for the whole of Berlin's "Museum Island". The jury awarded first prize to Grassi, only for the Staatlichen Museen zu Berlin (Berlin State Museums) to reject its choice. The situation was only resolved three years later by holding a second architecture competition, which was open to the five architecture firms that had been placed top in the 1994 contest, but this time the programme related solely to the refurbishment of the Neues Museum. British firm David Chipperfield Architects, the runner-up behind Grassi in 1994, was declared the winner.

== Buildings and projects ==
- Municipal centre of the Visconteo Castle of Abbiategrasso (1970)
- Student house, University of Chieti (1976)
- Prinz-Albrecht-Palais, Berlin (1984) (see: Niederkirchnerstraße)
- Roman theatre of Sagunto (1985)
- Building complex at Potsdamer Platz, Berlin (1993)

== Resource material ==
- Grassi, Giorgio, Architettura, lingua morta = Architecture, dead language. Quaderni di Lotus, 9, Electa, Milano 1988.
- Grassi, Giorgio, Pilar Insausti, and Tito Llopis, Giorgio Grassi: obras y proyectos 1962-1993 : [exposición] 28 enero-20 marzo 1994. Electa, Milano 1994.
- Brambilla, Ivan, Il progetto e la sua costruzione teorica. Aldo Rossi e Giorgio Grassi a confronto, LetteraVentidue, Siracusa 2024. ISBN 978-88-6242-787-6
- Brambilla, Ivan, Giorgio Grassi e l'antico. Osservazioni sul teatro di Sagunto e altri temi, collana Progettare Archeologia vol. VI, con contributi di Pier Federico Mauro Caliari e Valerio Tolve, Accademia Adrianea Edizioni, Roma 2025. ISBN 978-88-99013-33-2
