= Umberto Riva =

Italian architect, designer, and painter (1928–2021)

- Born: 16 June 1928; Milan, Italy
- Died: 25 June 2021 (aged 93); Palermo, Sicily, Italy
- Occupation(s): Architect, designer, painter

Umberto Riva (16 June 1928 – 25 June 2021) was an Italian architect, designer and painter.
