= Heinrich Tessenow =

German architect, professor and urban planner (1876–1950)

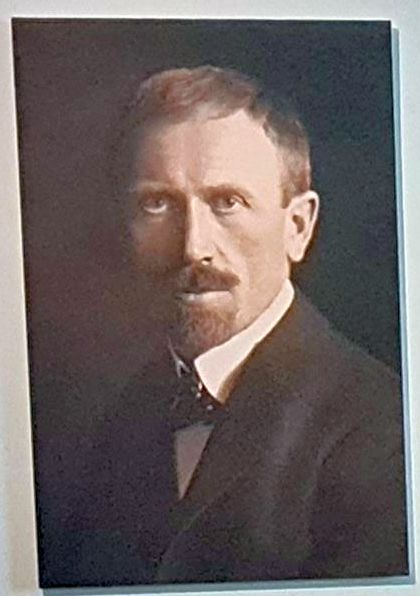
- Born: 7 April 1876; Rostock, German Empire
- Died: 1 November 1950 (aged 74); East Berlin, East Germany
- Occupation: Architect

Heinrich Tessenow (7 April 1876 – 1 November 1950) was a German architect, professor, and urban planner active at the time of the Weimar Republic. Considered one of the most notable personalities of the Weimar-era German architectural scene, Tessenow worked in the reform style, which combined simplified modern stylistic idioms with traditional building methods and forms. He was a mentor of Albert Speer.

== Biography ==
He was born in Rostock, Mecklenburg-Schwerin. His father was a carpenter, and he studied as an apprentice before studying architecture in a building trade school in Leipzig and at the Technische Hochschule München (today Technical University of Munich), where he later taught.

Tessenow and fellow architects Hermann Muthesius and Richard Riemerschmid are credited with the 1908 Gartenstadt Hellerau, near Dresden, a housing project that was the first tangible result of the influence of the English garden city movement in Germany. This particular strain of humane, functionalist urban planning would eventually lead to the extensive German housing projects of Ernst May and Bruno Taut in the 1920s. These principles were exported abroad through May's plans for Magnitogorsk and other Russian cities, and the widespread influence of Tessenow's student Otto Königsberger, who planned cities in Asia, Africa, and Latin America, including Bhubaneswar.

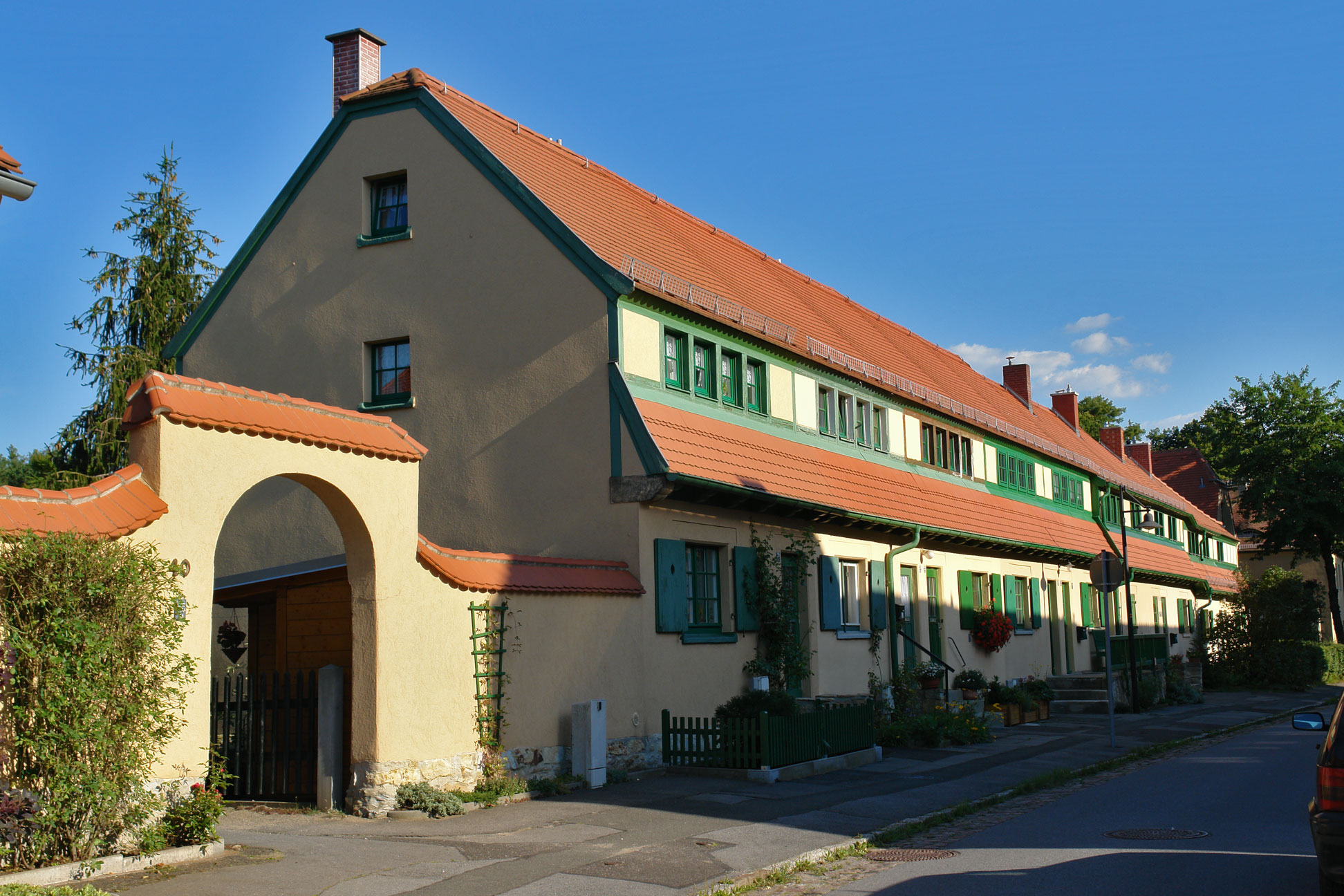
Houses in Hellerau Garden City, Dresden

During the next years, under the Weimar Republic, Tessenow became a member of the Bund Deutscher Architekten and of the Deutscher Werkbund. He received honorary degrees from the University of Rostock and the Technische Hochschule of Stuttgart.

Tessenow taught at the Technische Hochschule in Berlin-Charlottenburg from 1926 until 1934, when he was fired by the Nazi administration. Tessenow is also known through his student and one-time assistant, Albert Speer who later became a cabinet minister during the Third Reich. Tessenow taught Speer in 1925 (after Speer had been rejected from Hans Poelzig's class for bad drawing technique), and Speer became Tessenow's assistant in 1927 at the age of 22. Speer's memoirs describe Tessenow's personal, discursive, informal teaching style, and his preference for architecture that expressed national culture and simplified forms. He was known for the saying, "The simplest form is not always the best, but the best is always simple."

Until the end of World War II he lived retired in his country house, spending most of his time studying the reconstruction of urban centres in the Pomerania and Mecklenburg regions.

After the war he was asked to teach at the University of Berlin by the Soviet administration, where he was named Emeritus Professor. He spent the last years of his life on some important works never finished.

== Writings ==
- Housebuilding and Such Things (written as Hausbau und dergleichen in 1916, translated into English in 1989)

== Heinrich Tessenow Medal ==
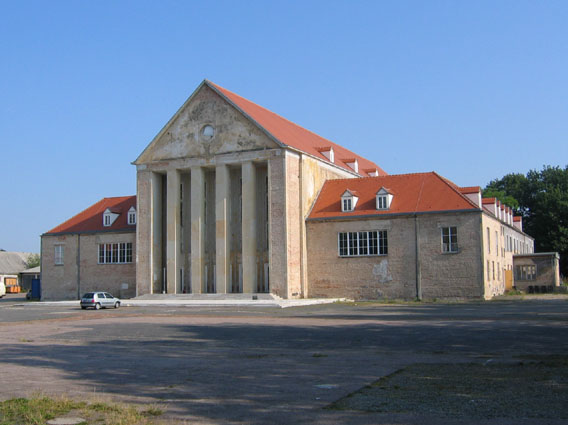
Festspielhaus Hellerau, Dresden, completed in 1911

Since 1962 the Alfred Toepfer Foundation of Hamburg has annually awarded the Heinrich Tessenow Medal for architectural excellence, honoring Tessenow's name. Together with the medal, each year the Alfred Toepfer Foundation also awards the Heinrich Tessenow Scholarship to a young architect. Past recipients include Christian Jonasse and Andrés Jaque, who have since become well known professionals.

== Portrayal in the media ==
- Trevor Howard played the role of Tessenow in the 1982 US television production Inside the Third Reich.
