= Knox Building =

Knox Building may refer to:

- Knox Building (Baton Rouge, Louisiana), listed on the National Register of Historic Places in East Baton Rouge Parish, Louisiana
- Knox Building (New York, New York), listed on the National Register of Historic Places in New York County, New York
