= America's Cup Building =

Coordinates: 39.46116°N 0.32422°W

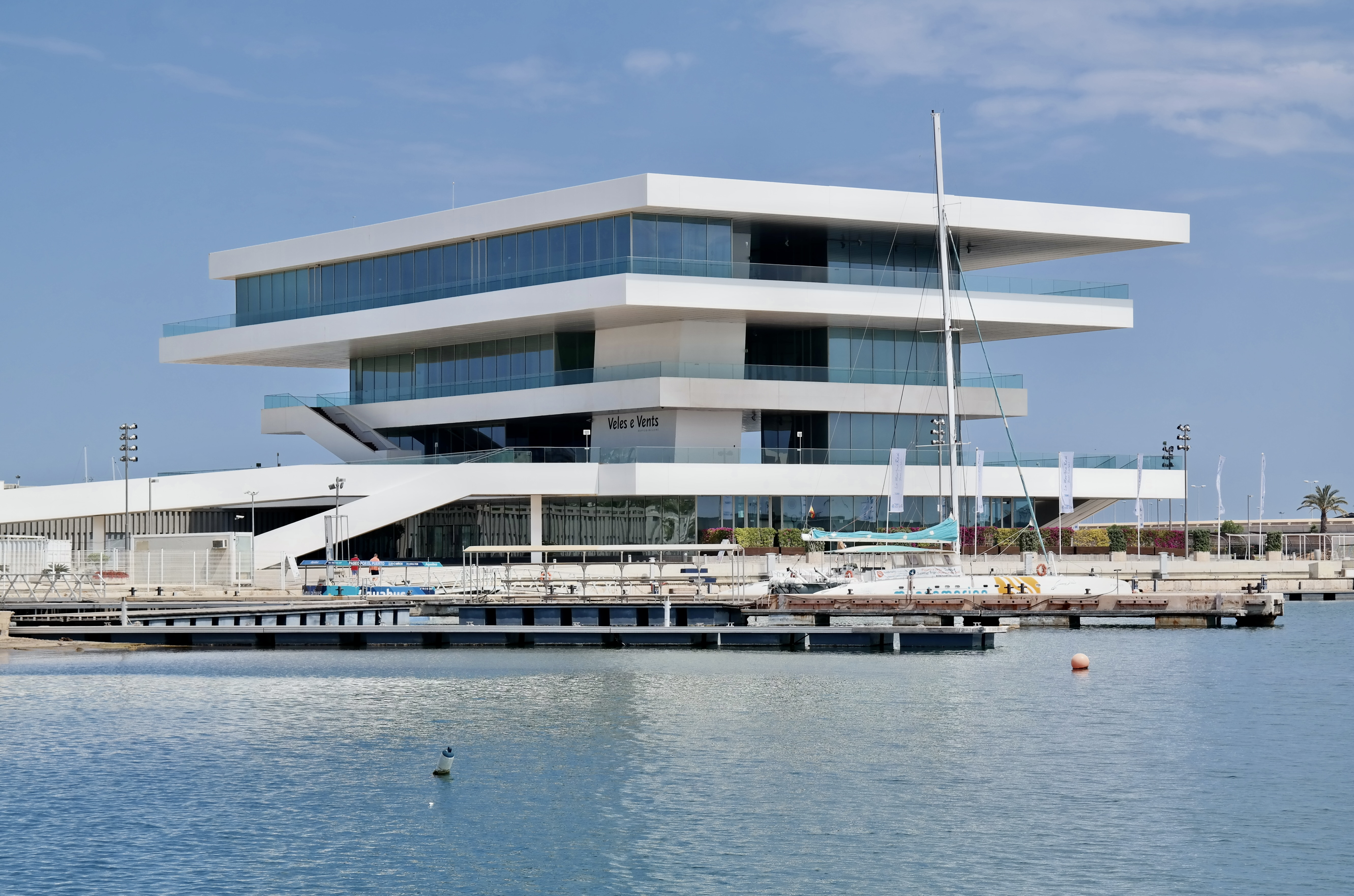
- The building in May 2014

General information
- Architectural style: modernism
- Construction started: 2005
- Opened: 2006

Design and construction
- Architect: David Chipperfield Architects Fermín Vázquez

The America's Cup Building, also known locally as Veles e Vents, is located in Valencia, Spain. The building was designed by the British architect David Chipperfield in collaboration with Spanish architect Fermín Vázquez and inaugurated in 2006. It was built to host the build-up to the 32nd America's Cup.

The design has won numerous architectural awards, including the 2006 Emirates Glass LEAF Award and the Royal Institute of British Architects European awards in 2007. It was also nominated for the Stirling Prize in 2007.
