= Deutsches Literaturarchiv Marbach =

German literature archive (est. 1955)

German Literature Archive

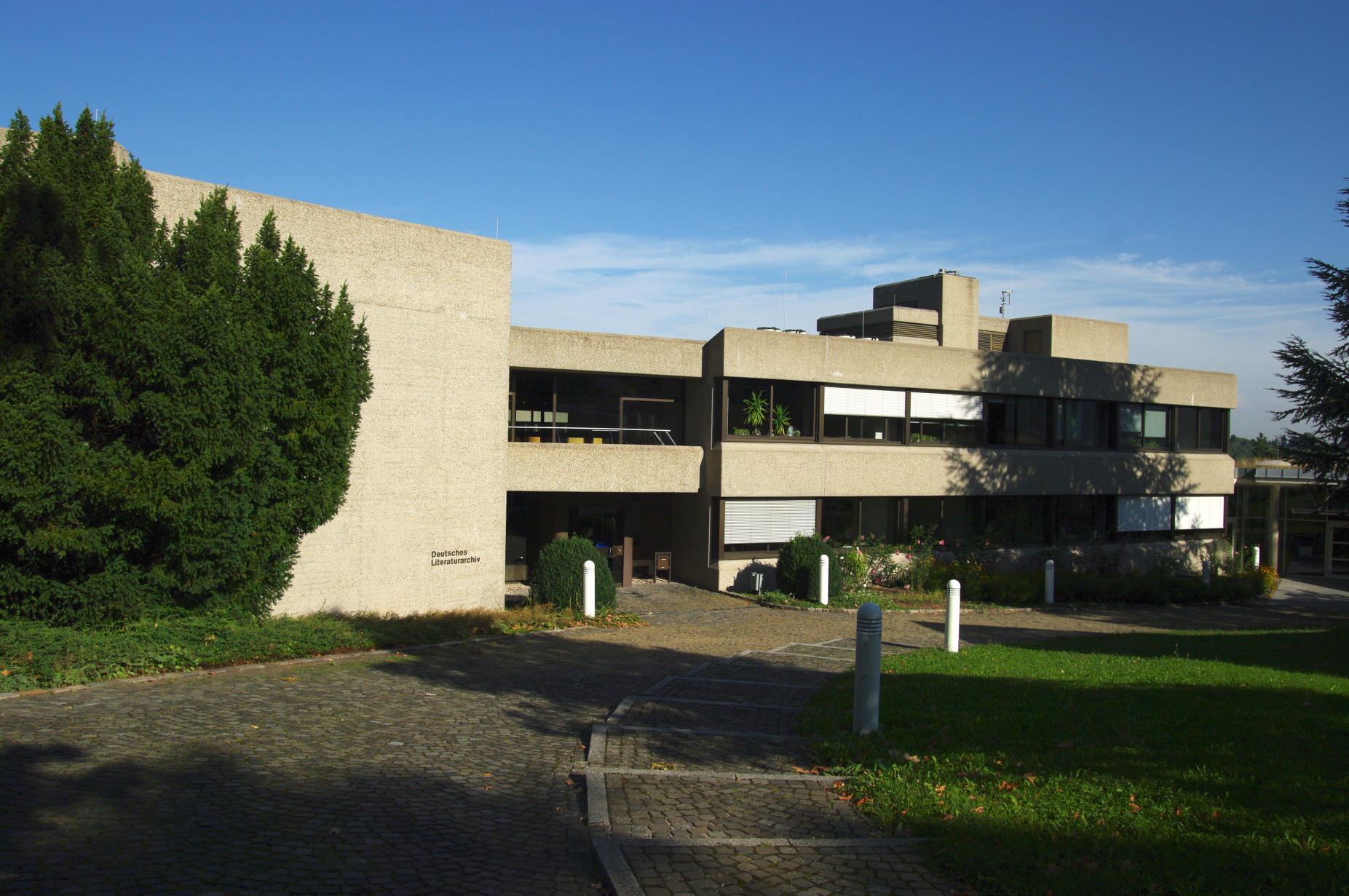
- Interactive map of German Literature Archive
- 48°56′11″N 9°15′22″E
- Location: Marbach am Neckar, Baden-Württemberg, Germany
- Type: Literature archive
- Affiliation: German Schiller Society[*]
- Period covered: 1750-present

Building information
- Architect: Elisabeth Kiefner; Jörg Kiefner; Wolfgang Lauber
- Construction date: 1970 - 1972
- Heritage status: Denkmalschutz (2018)
- Website: www.dla-marbach.de/en/

The German Literature Archive (German: Deutsches Literaturarchiv Marbach, DLA) was established in 1955, in Marbach am Neckar, the birthplace of German author Friedrich Schiller. It is a literary archive of worldwide importance. Its collections span literary and intellectual works from 1750 to the present and are open to anyone involved in source criticism. The DLA offers nearly 800,000 volumes and over 1,000 journals.

Together with the Schiller-Nationalmuseum (National museum for Friedrich Schiller), the Museum of Modern Literature and the Collegienhaus, the residential and communal space for researchers at the DLA, it builds the complete institution Deutsches Literaturarchiv Marbach. The institution consists of several departments:

- the Collecting Departments (Manuscripts Department with Cotta Archive, Library, Pictures and Objects)
- the Museum Department
- the Directorate and Administration Department

== Research and outreach ==
The DLA also functions as a non-university research institution and as an Institute of Advanced Study. The museums and events of the DLA provide access to literature, spark interest in close reading and train interpretation and discussion skills. The increased use of digitalization intends to facilitate progress in the research of literature.
