= Museum of Modern Literature =

Archive of 20th-century literature in Marbach am Neckar, Germany

Coordinates: 48°56′10″N 9°15′24″E

- Literaturmuseum der Moderne
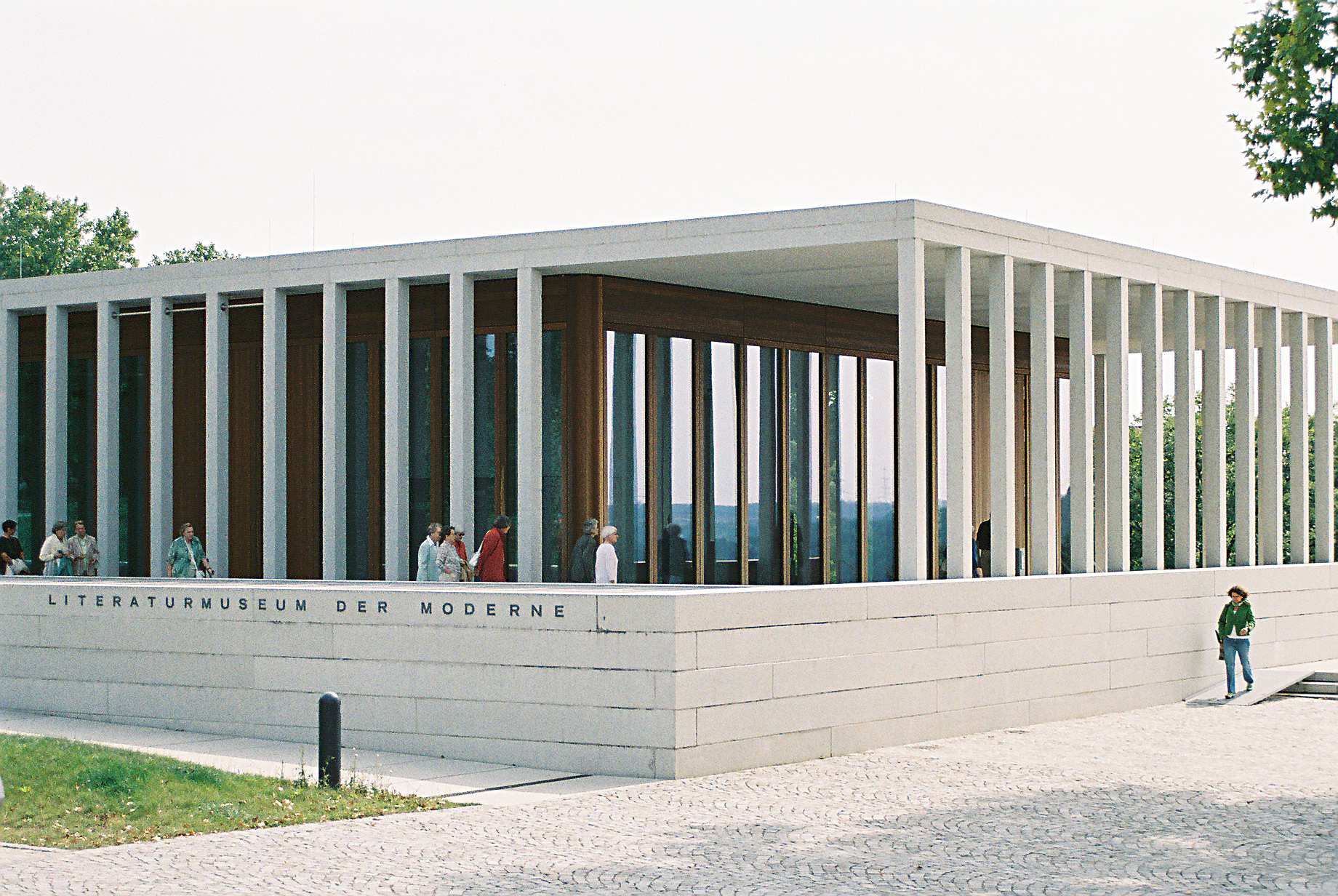
- Museum of Modern Literature
- Interactive map of the Museum of Modern Literature area

General information
- Location: Marbach am Neckar, Germany
- Completed: 6 June 2006
- Cost: €10m
- Client: German Archive of Literature, Schiller National Museum Directorate

Design and construction
- Architect: David Chipperfield

The Museum of Modern Literature (German: Literaturmuseum der Moderne, LiMo) is part of the German Literature Archive (Deutsches Literaturarchiv) in Marbach am Neckar, Germany. The museum won its architect the Stirling Prize in 2007.

Designed by British architect David Chipperfield and constructed at a cost of €10 million by Leonard Weiss GmbH, with engineering by Ingenieurgruppe Bauen, the museum opened in September 2006. It stands on a rock plateau in Marbach's scenic park, overlooking the valley of the Neckar River. It displays and archives 20th-century literature. Notable original manuscripts include The Trial by Franz Kafka and Berlin Alexanderplatz by Alfred Döblin.
