= Salerno Courthouse =

Judiciary complex in Salerno, Italy

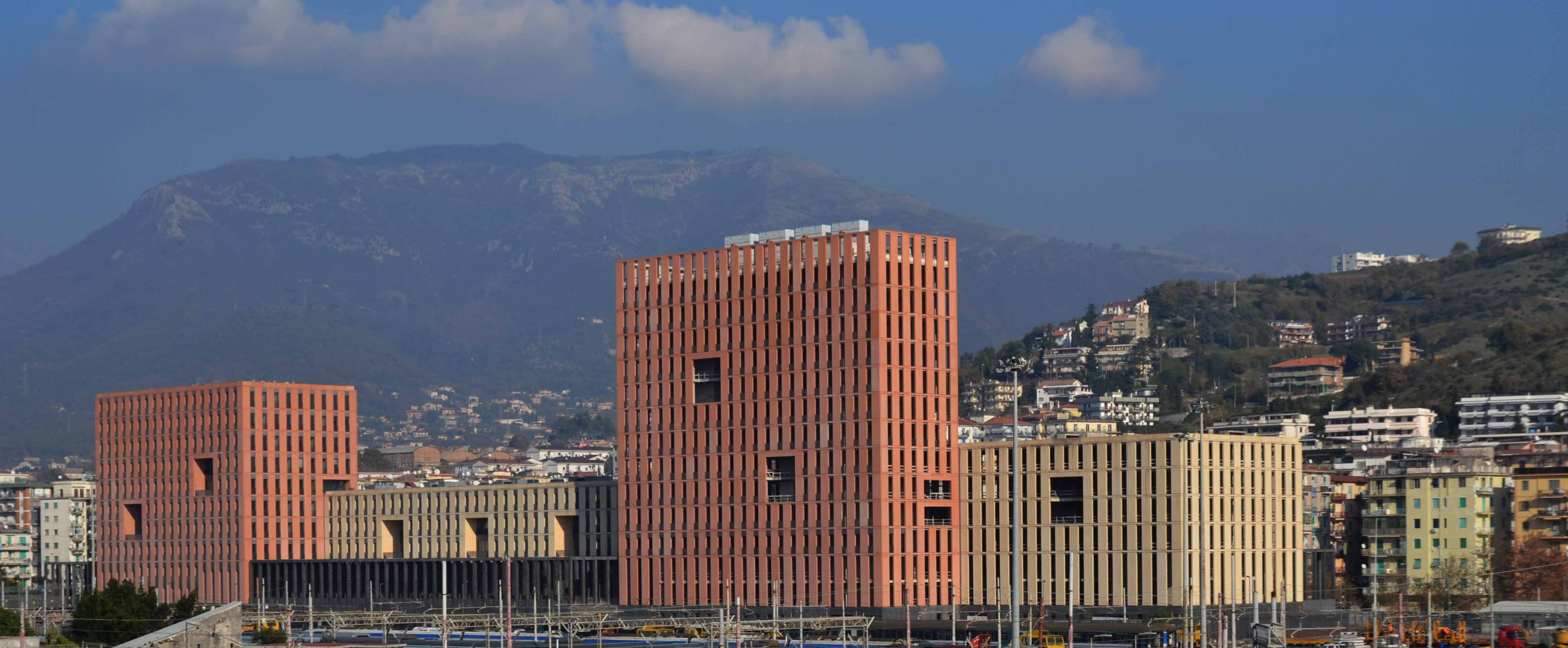
- Interactive map of the Salerno Courthouse area

General information
- Type: Courthouse
- Location: Salerno, Campania, Italy
- Coordinates: 40°40′43.5″N 14°46′27.6″E
- Construction started: 2003
- Completed: 2018
- Opening: 2014

Design and construction
- Architect: David Chipperfield

The Salerno Courthouse (Cittadella Giudiziaria, "Judiciary Citadel"), is a judicial complex located on Via Dalmazia in Salerno, Italy. It is designed by British architect David Chipperfield, and consists of six buildings characterized by large glass facades and varying heights. The structures are interconnected through porticoes and courtyards, and are situated on a black stone platform that serves as a public square.

== History ==
The initial plans for the new courthouse complex date back to the 1980s, when the then Salerno administration envisioned its construction in the eastern part of the city. In 1993, with Vincenzo De Luca's election as mayor and following opposition from the public prosecutor's office to the original plan, the project site was relocated to the city center, near the disused freight yard. In 1999, the municipal government launched an international ideas competition, inviting 80 architecture firms to participate. The winning entry was submitted by British architect David Chipperfield, with the Catalan firm Miralles-Tagliabue and French architect Dominique Perrault securing second and third places, respectively.

Construction began in 2003, with an initial plan to complete the project within approximately two years. However, progress was halted due to unforeseen underground water tables that had not been accounted for in the original design, despite the proximity of the Irno River. Further delays occurred in 2008 when the contractor went bankrupt. In 2010, the construction site was entrusted to the company Soledil, which successfully delivered the first three blocks which were inaugurated on 7 March 2014.

Work to complete the remaining structures resumed in January 2016, under the responsibility of the RTI Passarelli SpA and Costruzioni Barozzi. The project was funded with 27 million euros allocated by the CIPE as part of an amendment to the 2014 Stability Law, which provided a total of 30 million euros for judicial infrastructure, specifically aimed at completing ongoing projects. The whole complex was completed in 2018. The offices' relocation ended in 2020.

== Sources ==
- "Un futuro per Salerno". Domus. No. 829. Milan. 2000.
- Luis Fernandez-Galiano, ed. (2008). "David Chipperfield 1984-2009". Arquitectura Viva. No. 131. Madrid. pp. 54–55.
- Leoni, Giovanni (2005). David Chipperfield. Milan: Motta Editore.
- Fernando Marquez Cecilia; Richard Levene, eds. (2006). "David Chipperfield 1991-2006". El Croquis. Madrid. pp. 192–199.
- Vanacore, R. (2016). "Oltre lo stile. Un'architettura accogliente: la Cittadella Giudiziaria". Rassegna ANIAI. No. Speciale Dossier Salerno. Naples. pp. 72–75.
