= One Kensington Gardens =

Residential building in London, England

Coordinates: 51.5019°N 0.1854°W

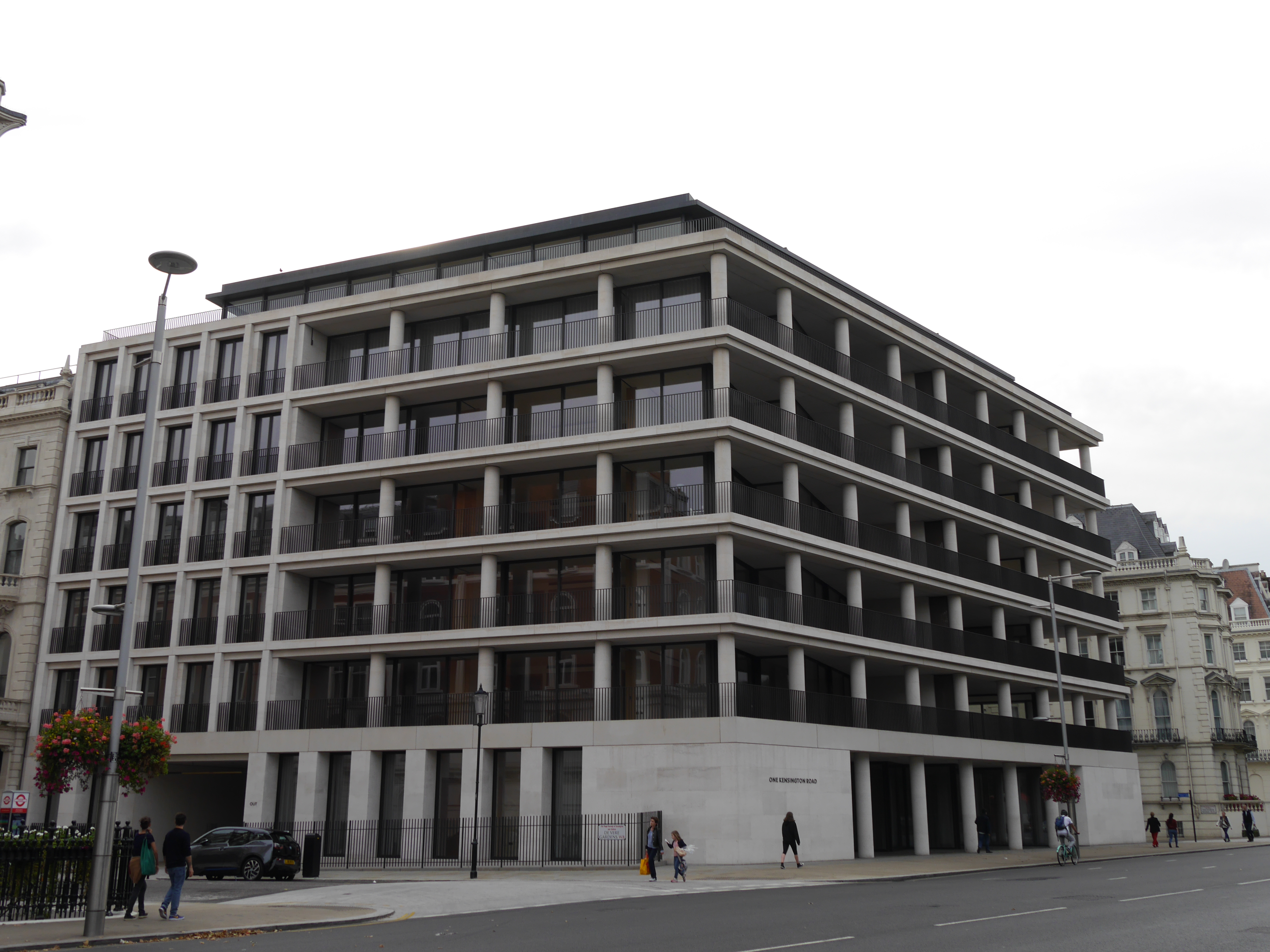
One Kensington Gardens, 2016

One Kensington Gardens is a residential development of 97 apartments in a nine-storey (two of them underground) block in Kensington, London, completed in 2015, overlooking Kensington Gardens, and bounded by Victoria Road and De Vere Gardens.

It was designed by David Chipperfield Architects, and the main contractor was Sir Robert McAlpine.

It was built on the site of the 1950s-built Palace and Thistle hotels at the northern end, and the De Vere Gardens mansion block at the southern end. The site was bought by the Candy brothers for £69 million, and sold 18 months later in 2008 to an Abu Dhabi consortium for £320 million.

In 2015, it was reported that two-bedroom flats were for sale, starting at £6 million, up to £30 million for a five-bedroom flat overlooking the park.
