= 452 Fifth Avenue =

Office skyscraper in Manhattan, New York

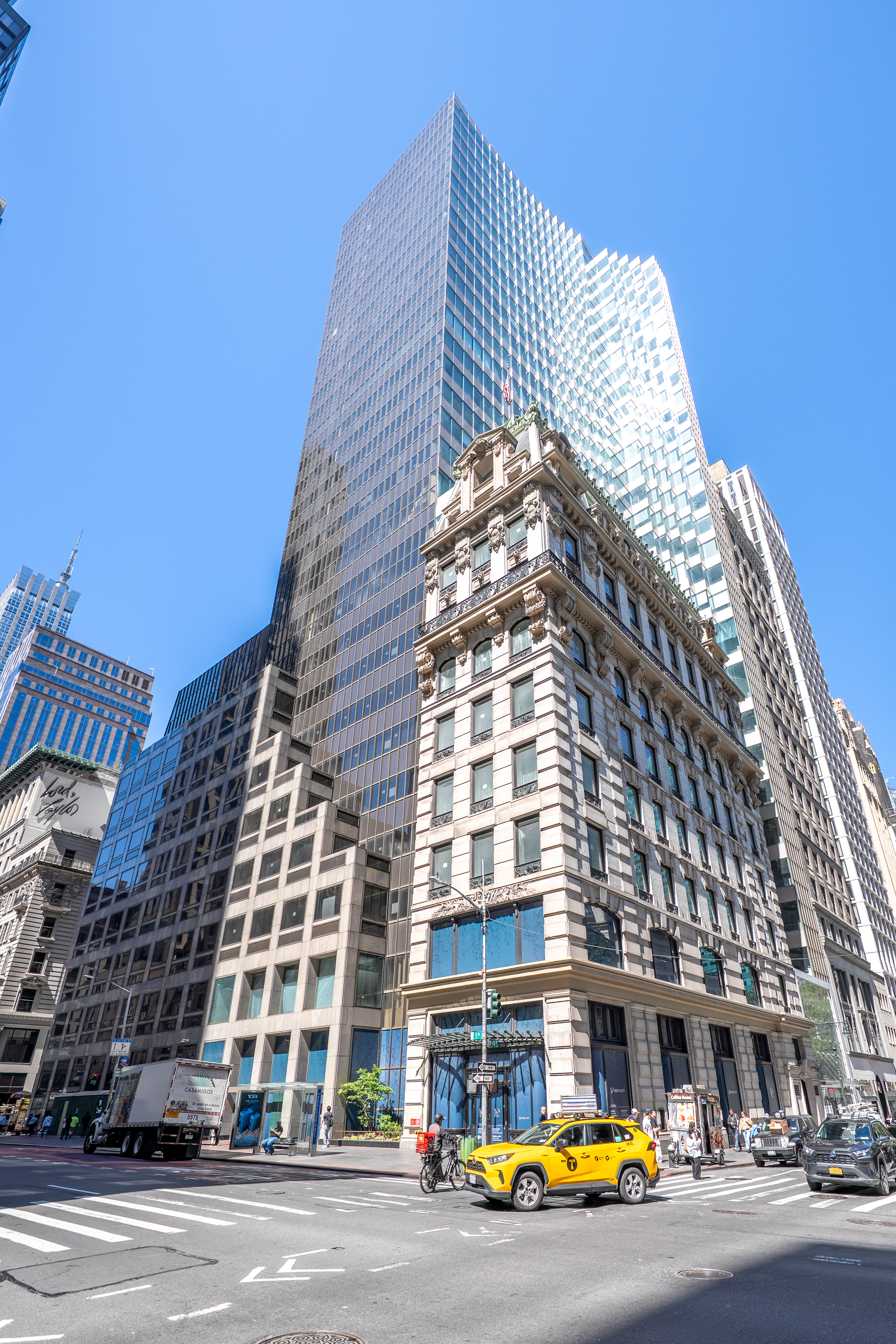
- Interactive map of the 452 Fifth Avenue area
- Former names: Republic National Bank of New York Building, Knox Building
- Alternative names: HSBC Tower

General information
- Status: Completed
- Architectural style: Modernism
- Location: 452 Fifth Avenue (1 West 39th Street); Manhattan, New York
- Coordinates: 40°45′08″N 73°58′57″W
- Construction started: 1980
- Completed: 1985
- Owner: Property & Building Corporation

Height
- Roof: 400 feet (121.9 m)

Technical details
- Floor count: 30
- Floor area: 863,000 sq ft (80,200 m^{2})

Design and construction
- Architect: Eli Attia Architects
- Knox Building
- U.S. National Register of Historic Places
- New York State Register of Historic Places
- New York City Landmark
- Location: 452 5th Ave., New York, New York
- Coordinates: 40°45′08″N 73°58′57″W
- Area: less than one acre
- Built: 1901
- Architect: Duncan, John H.
- Architectural style: Beaux Arts
- NRHP reference No.: 82003381
- NYSRHP No.: 06101.001707
- NYCL No.: 1091

Significant dates
- Added to NRHP: June 3, 1982
- Designated NYSRHP: April 9, 1982
- Designated NYCL: September 23, 1980

452 Fifth Avenue (also the HSBC Tower and 10 Bryant Park; formerly the Republic National Bank Building) is an office building at the southwest corner of Fifth Avenue and 40th Street in the Midtown Manhattan neighborhood of New York City. The building primarily consists of the 30-story, 400-foot (120 m) HSBC Tower, completed in late 1985 and designed by Attia & Perkins. The 10-story Knox Building, a Beaux-Arts office building designed in 1902 by John H. Duncan, is preserved at the base of the skyscraper. 452 Fifth Avenue faces Bryant Park immediately to the north.

The HSBC Tower is designed with a glass facade, which curves around the Knox Building to the north; a similar curved tower across Fifth Avenue was never built. The Knox Building's facade remains largely as it was originally designed, with decorated limestone cladding, a cornice above the sixth floor, and a mansard roof. The Knox Building is a New York City designated landmark and is on the National Register of Historic Places. Internally, the tower is tied into the stories of the Knox Building.

The Knox Building was erected between 1901 and 1902 for Edward M. Knox, who operated the Knox Hat Company and leased out several stories to office tenants. In 1964, the Knox heirs sold the building to a group that founded the Republic National Bank of New York and used the building as the bank's headquarters. The bank acquired the neighboring lots in the 1970s and hired Attia & Perkins to design a tower to house its new world headquarters, which would wrap around the Knox Building. The tower was expanded in the 1990s and sold to the investment bank HSBC. In October 2009, HSBC Holdings sold the building to Midtown Equities and Israeli holding company IDB Group, the latter of which passed the building to a subsidiary, Property & Building Corporation (PBC). HSBC continued to lease back its space in the building until 2022, when the bank announced it would relocate.

== Site ==
The building at 452 Fifth Avenue is on the western sidewalk between 39th and 40th Streets, in the Midtown Manhattan neighborhood of New York City. The building occupies an L-shaped land lot with a frontage of 197 feet (60 m) along Fifth Avenue to the east, a depth of 185 feet (56 m), and an area of 32,834 square feet (3,050.4 m^{2}). 452 Fifth Avenue is the eastern end of a row of masonry structures on 40th Street between Fifth and Sixth Avenues, which forms the southern border of Bryant Park. On the same block to the west are the Engineering Societies' Building, Engineers' Club Building, The Bryant, the American Radiator Building, and Bryant Park Studios. Other nearby places include the New York Public Library Main Branch across 40th Street to the north, 461 Fifth Avenue to the northeast, the Stavros Niarchos Foundation Library and 10 East 40th Street to the east, and the Lord & Taylor Building to the south.

The northeastern corner of the base contains the Knox Building at Fifth Avenue and 40th Street, which has been incorporated into 452 Fifth Avenue. The original Knox Building covers a lot of 83 by 110 feet (25 by 34 m). The Knox Building directly replaced the Lawrence Kip residence, which had been on that corner since the mid-19th century. At the beginning of the 20th century, development was centered on Fifth Avenue north of 34th Street, where new store buildings were quickly replacing the street's brownstone residences. These included the B. Altman and Company Building, the Tiffany and Company Building, the Gorham Building, and the Lord & Taylor Building.

The modern skyscraper includes the former Kress Building at the corner of Fifth Avenue and 39th Street, which was originally designed in the Art Deco style and built in the mid-1930s. (Note: The building is variously cited as having been constructed in 1934 or 1935.) An annex on 20 West 40th Street replaced the Willkie Memorial Building, designed by Henry Janeway Hardenbergh and built in 1905.

== Architecture ==
The modern skyscraper at 452 Fifth Avenue, formerly known as the Republic National Bank Building, is composed of four distinct sections. The ten-story Knox Building, (Note: The Knox Building has also been cited as having 11 stories.) at the southwest corner of 40th Street and Fifth Avenue, was designed by John H. Duncan in the Beaux-Arts style. The newer HSBC Tower (originally the Republic National Bank Tower), occupying much of the rest of the site, was designed by Attia & Perkins. (Note: The tower was designed chiefly by lead partner Eli Attia. Brad Perkins left the firm while the tower was under construction, with the tower being completed under the design supervision of Eli Attia Architects.) The Kress Building and another structure on 39th Street are also incorporated into the skyscraper. The building is 400 feet (120 m) tall, with 30 stories.

The Knox Building is on the National Register of Historic Places and is protected by the New York City Landmarks Preservation Commission (LPC) as a city landmark. However, the Kress Building was not similarly designated because the LPC did not find it to be architecturally significant.

=== Facade ===
==== Knox Building ====
The Knox Building's facade remains largely as it was originally designed. The first six floors are clad with rusticated blocks of limestone along Fifth Avenue; a similar motif is used on 40th Street, but the third through sixth floors use buff brick instead of genuine rusticated limestone. The first floor has show windows, and the entrance is shielded by an iron-and-glass canopy on Fifth Avenue. A mezzanine level was originally placed in the upper section of the first floor, and a sparsely decorated cornice runs above the first floor. On the second floor, the arched windows on 40th Street have keyed blocks above them, while the rectangular window on Fifth Avenue has a palm branch and female head above the center.

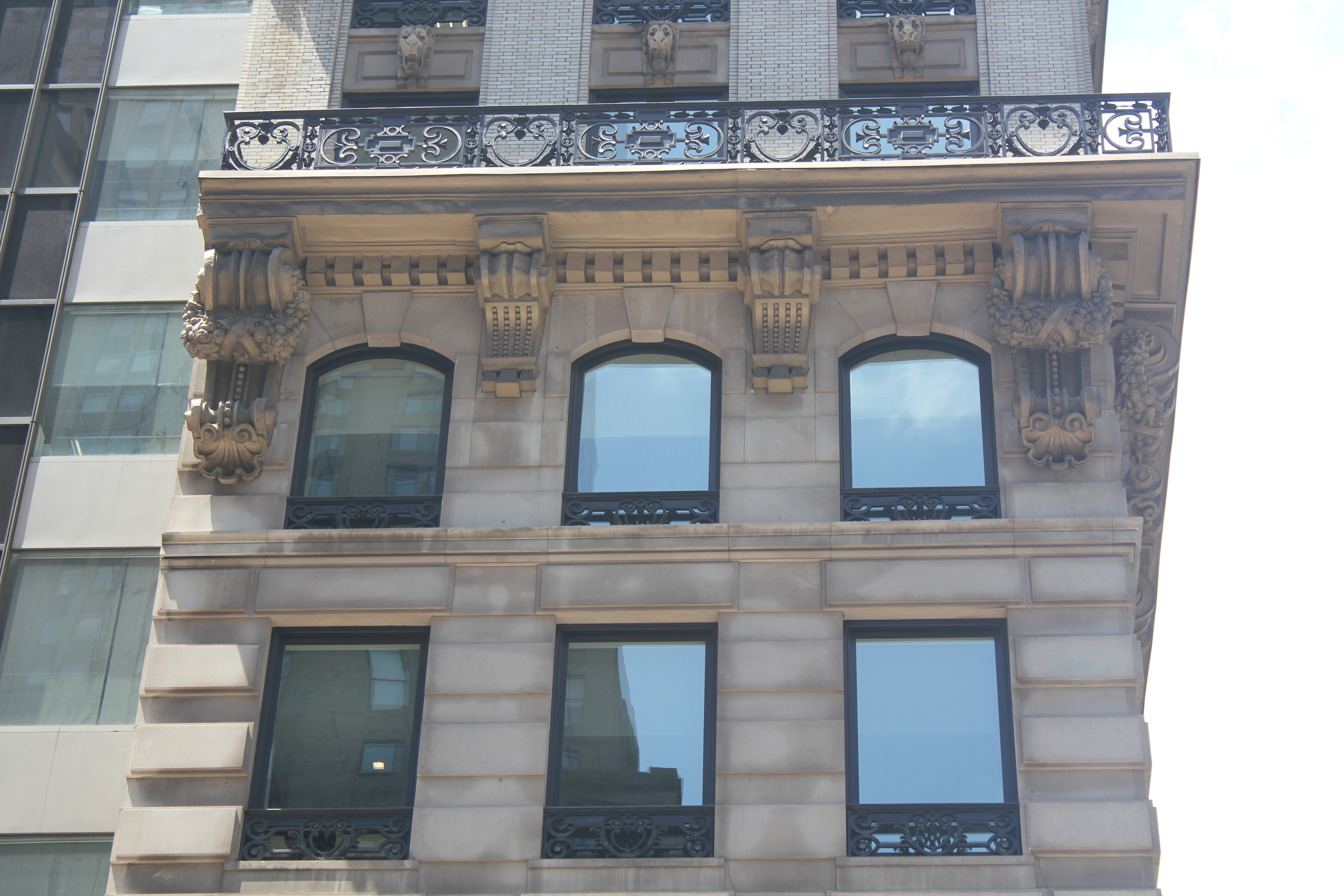
The fifth and sixth stories of the Knox Building on Fifth Avenue; the cornice above the sixth floor is carried by brackets

The third through eighth floors have elaborately decorated window screens. The third through sixth floors use a similar window arrangement, with three windows per story on Fifth Avenue and eight per story on 40th Street. The extreme ends of either facade contain quoins. Above the sixth floor, there is a cornice with dentils and large console brackets; the metal railing above the cornice has since been removed. The seventh and eighth stories contain windows between vertical brick piers and horizontal ornamental spandrels. The spandrels on the Fifth Avenue facade and in the end bays on 40th Street are decorated with lions' heads and elaborate cartouches. A bracketed cornice runs above the eighth floor.

The top of the Knox Building is a double-height mansard roof that contains dormer windows. On Fifth Avenue, the central dormer is a large two-story opening topped by a gable with a female head. There are single-height dormers on each side of the large opening, at the ninth story. On 40th Street, the outermost bays have two-story dormer windows and the inner bays are designed as single-height dormers at the ninth story. The inner bays on 40th Street contain three wide openings on the tenth floor, each designed with nine narrow vertical glass panes. The top of the mansard has a cresting containing torches and anthemia with eagles. When built, the southern and western facades were brick party walls.

==== HSBC Tower ====
The HSBC Tower is designed with a glass facade. On the northern side, the facade appears to curve around the Knox Building in a series of steps. This, in turn, gave the HSBC Tower the impression that it had an irregularly shaped roof. The eastern facade along Fifth Avenue is tinted in bronze to blend in with the facades of other structures on the avenue. By contrast, the northern facade along 40th Street contains full-height silicone-stiffened glass panels, with glazing that gives the facade a green tint. The green facade was intended to complement the Knox Building. The tower's facade was built without exterior vertical mullions but is instead stiffened by internal glass mullions, with structural silicone linking the facade and the floor plates. A two-story mockup was created in Florida before the HSBC Tower's facade was installed.

The HSBC Tower is recessed 10 feet (3.0 m) from the original building's street-facing facades. According to Attia & Perkins, this allowed the HSBC Tower to rise as a distinct entity from the mansard roof of the Knox Building. The HSBC Tower was originally planned with a mirror-image tower across Fifth Avenue, which was never built.

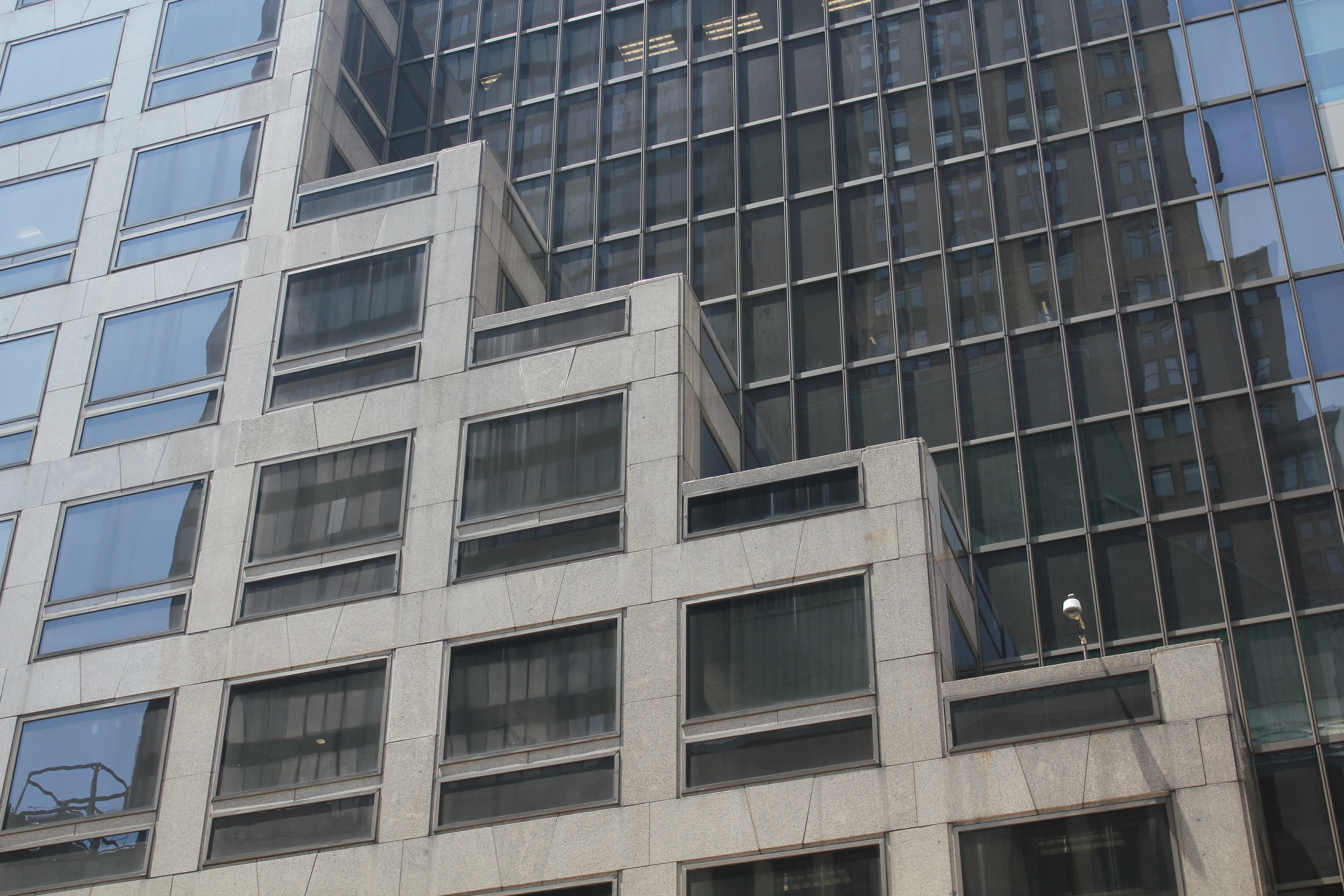
Rebuilt facade of the Kress Building, which ascends from north (right) to south (left) like a staircase

The tower is cantilevered over the Kress Building at the southeastern corner of the site. Several 25-foot-long (7.6 m) beams are cantilevered from strips that rise from the 11th story to the roof. The Kress Building's original facade had included six each of black marble panels and carved limestone crests, as well as four sets of brass doors, including two revolving doors. Unlike the Knox Building, the facade of the Kress Building was completely redesigned when the Republic National Bank Tower was built. The facade of the former Kress Building was replaced with a granite cladding containing rose, beige, and gray hues. The Kress Building's rebuilt facade ascends from north to south like a staircase. At ground level, the Kress Building received a glass facade as well. The Kress Building's original decorations were placed into storage when the HSBC Tower was built.

=== Interior ===
The floor areas of 452 Fifth Avenue's constituent structures range from 42,000 to 50,000 square feet (3,900 to 4,600 m^{2}), which allowed the tower's original tenant, Republic National Bank, to consolidate many of its departments on their own floors. The building as a whole occupied 804,000 square feet (74,700 m^{2}) when completed, of which the tower comprised 371,000 square feet (34,500 m^{2}).

The building has bank vaults 50 feet (15 m) below ground, spanning 25,000 square feet (2,300 m^{2}). The lobby, which faces 40th Street, contains a double-height glazed facade as well as an entrance canopy. The space covers 3,700 square feet (340 m^{2}) and is clad with stone and glass. The lobby has a banking space on Fifth Avenue, used for quick deposits and transactions. It was designed with several chandeliers, including a globe-shaped fixture designed by Attia Architects. The banking space covers 17,000 square feet (1,600 m^{2}).

Eight of the lowest floors in the HSBC Tower's base span 40,000 square feet (3,700 m^{2}) each and are tied into floors in the old Knox Building. At each of these floors, glass corridors connect the HSBC Tower and the old Knox Building, giving the impression of bridges. The Kress Building, also eight stories tall, was expanded by two floors, with a terrace installed on the Kress-Building's roof. This required the removal of a bulkhead on the top of the Kress Building. The two additional floors originally served as a trading floor that could fit 260 people. The trading desk was designed to be flexible and had no fixed-position furniture. According to Nancy J. Ruddy of Eli Attia Architects, the trading floor was "one of the largest single trading floors" in the city when completed.

The first full story in the HSBC Tower is the 11th floor, which was designed as an executive dining room story. Originally, the corridors of that story were decorated with pieces of artwork from Republic National Bank's collection. The main dining room was clad with original wall paneling taken from the Knox Building's banking hall, as well as some replica panels, which were created because there were not enough original panels for the whole room. The serving counters of the dining room were adapted from the green marble countertops of the Knox Building's original banking hall. Above the 12th floor, each story has 13,200 square feet (1,230 m^{2}). The 27th through 29th floors were designed as executive suites but, because of Republic National Bank's rapid expansion in the late 1980s, some of the suites were converted to operations offices.

== History ==
=== Original structure ===
Charles Knox founded the Knox Hat Company on Fulton Street, in what is now Lower Manhattan, in 1838. The company had many customers until the American Civil War, and it became known for selling high-quality hats. At some point after the Civil War, Charles Knox's son Edward M. Knox took over the family business. Through the latter half of the 19th century, Knox opened stores in the fashionable shopping districts of Manhattan; by 1900, the Knox hat was known worldwide.

==== Construction and early years ====
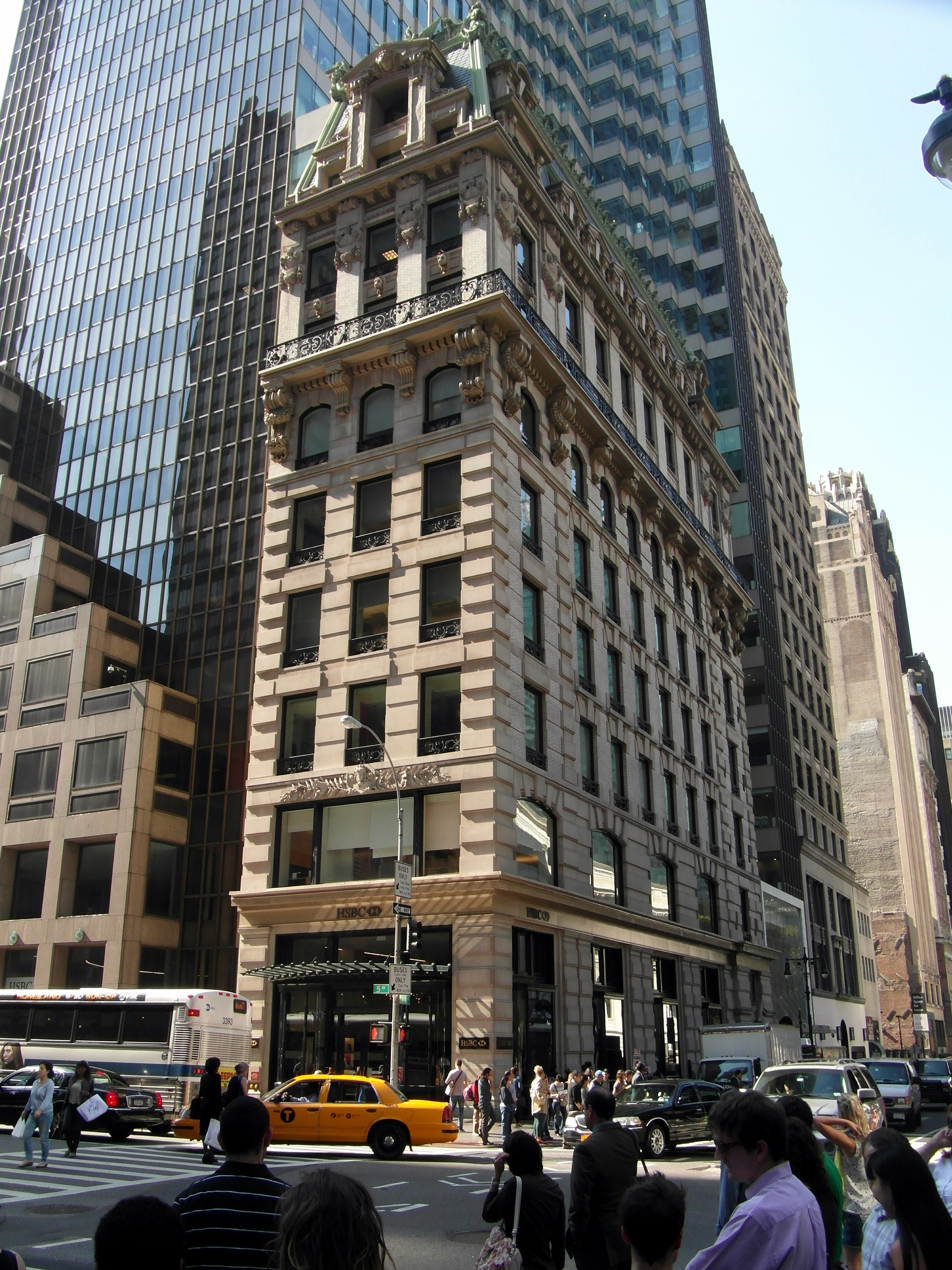
The Knox Building as seen from 40th Street

In 1901, Edward Knox acquired the Kip mansion at the southwest corner of Fifth Avenue and 40th Street, across from the vacant site of the Croton Reservoir, later the New York Public Library Main Branch. The Central Realty, Bond and Trust Company was reported in the media as the buyer, but it was acting on behalf of Knox. The Real Estate Record and Guide reported that the Knox purchase, along with that of the Gorham Manufacturing Company at Fifth Avenue and 36th Street, "are interesting indications of the way the tide is setting up 5th avenue". Knox received title to the site that April for $450,000, and he hired John Duncan to extend and remodel the old Kip mansion for commercial use. At the end of the following month, Duncan filed plans for a new 10-story building on the Kip site.

The Knox Building was completed in October 1902 and originally contained a Knox hat store at its base. The store was described as having carved and paneled walnut decoration, plate-glass mirrors with brought-iron frames, bronze-and-marble counter tops, large chandeliers, and gold-plated cabinets. A mezzanine gallery, with an ornamental railing, hung above three sides of the store. In March 1903, six months after the store opened, the New-York Tribune reported that the store "has already become one of the chief features of the avenue". The same year, Knox split his business into manufacturing and retail companies. The Knox Hat Manufacturing Company's offices and the main store of the E.M. Knox Hat Retail Company were placed within the building, and some of the office space was rented to other tenants. By 1914, the building was valued at $860,000. Among the Knox Building's tenants during the 1900s and 1910s were a photography studio operated by Percy D. Brewster, a store operated by Louise Lewis, the Town Topics Publishing Company, and the offices of architect George K. Thompson. The Republican National Committee also leased space in 1918, though it moved out after eighteen months.

==== Mid-20th century ====
By early 1920, negotiations were underway to lease the Knox Building to a construction syndicate. At the time, the Farmers' Loan and Trust Company owned the building. Coincidentally, around that time, Benjamin Mordecai and E. Clifford Potter incorporated the Fortieth Street and Fifth Avenue Corporation. After acquiring the leasehold, Mordecai and Potter renovated the building extensively. In January 1922, August Heckscher acquired the leasehold for $2 million. The Knox Building was one of eleven large Midtown office buildings that Heckscher owned, which collectively were valued at $30 million by 1923.

Tenants in the Knox Building during the 1920s included the Gates-Browne Corporation, the Arthur S. Kane Picture Corporation, and perfumers Yardley & Co. The Knox Hat Company also renewed its lease in 1928 for the ground-floor storefront, basement, and mezzanine for $3,500 per foot ($11,000/m) of storefront length; at the time, it was a record amount for a lease of a corner storefront on Fifth Avenue. Albert B. Ashforth was appointed as the Knox Building's leasing agent in 1935, and the Knox Hat Company signed a lease for space on the second floor the same year. Other lessees in the 1930s also included Brown & Wells Inc., hairdressers Julian Inc., and publishers Parfumerie St. Denis Inc. and House of Peters Inc.

In 1964, the Knox heirs sold the building to a group headed by Martin Ackerman. With that acquisition, the Ackerman group filed to incorporate the Republic National Bank of New York within the Knox Building. The firm of Kahn & Jacobs designed a renovation for the building. The Joseph P. Blitz Company was the contractor for the interior renovation, which was completed by 1965. The exterior was largely kept intact "to preserve its architectural beauty", according to The New York Times. The exterior renovation consisted of minor window replacements, as well as the installation of three rusticated piers on 40th Street to replace ornamental piers. The bank's space at the Knox Building formally opened in January 1966 at a ceremony attended by U.S. Senator Robert F. Kennedy.

=== Tower development ===
Over eleven years starting around 1970, Republic Bank assembled a 51,000-square-foot (4,700 m^{2}) site on the west side of Fifth Avenue between 39th and 40th Streets. This included the Kress Building on the corner of Fifth Avenue and 39th Street, as well as two structures between the Kress and Knox buildings. The S. H. Kress store in the eponymous building had closed in 1977 after operating for 42 years.

==== Construction ====
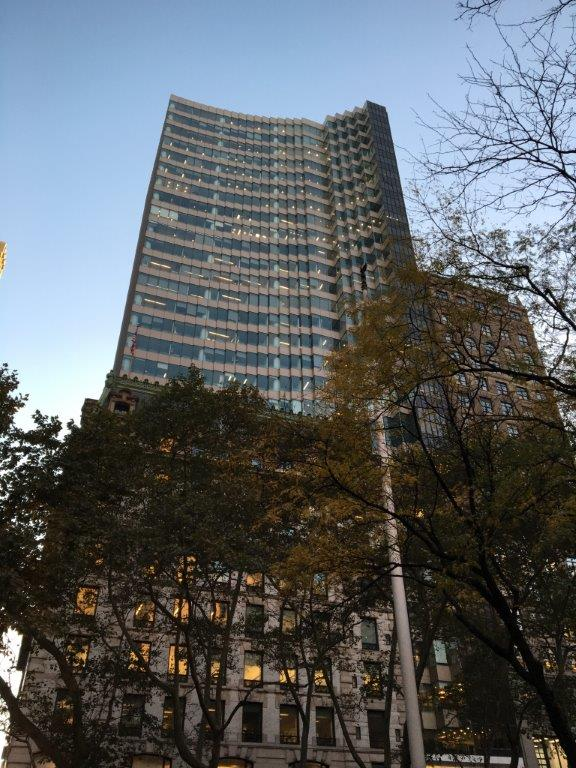
HSBC Tower as seen from Bryant Park

The New York City Planning Commission approved an eleven-story annex of the Republic National Bank Building on Fifth Avenue, south of the original structure, in 1974. Republic was obligated to design the annex to "harmonize" with that of the New York Public Library Main Branch, an official city landmark. By the late 1970s, the bank planned to erect a world headquarters tower on the site to consolidate operations at 15 buildings across New York City. Republic specified that six of its Fifth Avenue structures, including the Knox Building, had to remain on the site because some of the bank's operations in these buildings could not be halted. Furthermore, the bank did not want the tower to overshadow the design of the Knox Building. Republic hired several firms, including Kohn Pedersen Fox, in 1978 to create designs for a new tower on the site.

The LPC designated the Knox Building as a city landmark in 1980. Despite not wanting to destroy the building, Republic originally opposed the designation, which prevented major changes to the design without the LPC's consent. The bank ultimately expressed its support for the landmark designation. By mid-1981, plans for Republic's tower had yet to be finalized. A mirror-image tower on the northeast corner of Fifth Avenue and 39th Street, which Republic had proposed on the site of a Woolworths store, had been disapproved the previous March. In September 1981, Attia Architects presented plans for a 27-story tower wrapping around the Knox Building. The tower was to cover 700,000 square feet (65,000 m^{2}). The project was to be the largest development on Fifth Avenue south of 42nd Street since the Empire State Building, which had been completed five decades earlier. The Knox Building was added to the NRHP on June 3, 1982. Republic changed its plans in 1983, adding two stories without changing the overall roof height.

Turner Construction was the general contractor in charge of the tower's construction, and various other consultants and architects were also hired for the project. The firm of Platt and Byard restored the Knox Building as part of the project. Some of the original design elements that had been removed in the 1960s were restored, including the ground-floor storefront windows; the glass entrance canopy on Fifth Avenue; and upper-story windows, which had been replaced with sliding windows. The Knox Building was completely reconstructed internally, and the Kress Building's facade was replaced as well. The Kress Building was renovated in segments because one of its tenants refused to leave until July 1984. Just west of the Knox Building, there was controversy over the bank's demolition of the Willkie Memorial Building, the former Freedom House headquarters at 20 West 40th Street. That structure's ornamentation was removed while the LPC was considering it for landmark status, and the building was ultimately demolished completely.

==== Completion and expansion ====
The Republic National Bank Tower was completed by late 1985 at an estimated cost of $100 million. The bank had initially planned to occupy only the 1st through 7th stories, offering the 8th through 11th stories for temporary lease. The bank ultimately ended up also leasing the 8th through 11th stories. The 12th story and higher were leased to tenants such as the Federal Deposit Insurance Corporation, Aetna, Krungthai Bank, and Hewitt Associates. The 25th through 28th floors had not been rented while the top floor was to be used by Republic as an executive penthouse. In addition, clothing retailer The Limited rented a storefront in part of the ground and mezzanine stories. Republic National Bank had allocated space in its new tower for 1,200 employees, but the bank had 2,000 employees before the end of the decade. By the early 1990s, Republic was leasing space in nearby buildings.

Fox & Fowle proposed a 12-story building at 20 West 40th Street, adjacent to the Republic National Bank Tower, in 1989 or 1990. Republic rejected the plan as being too small for its needs. In September 1993, Republic proposed a 16-story structure with a two-story entrance and a limestone facade tapering to a pyramidal roof. In exchange, the bank proposed restoring the Knox Building's Fifth Avenue entrance marquee and seventh-story railing. One of Manhattan Community Board 5's committees initially opposed the plan but, after Republic emphasized that the work would create 500 jobs, the community board overruled the committee. The addition was to be contiguous with the existing tower and the Knox Building, so it required LPC approval. After multiple revisions, including a stipulation that the facade's material be changed to brick, the LPC approved the project in November 1993. The City Planning Commission also gave Republic a waiver to permit the construction of four additional stories, covering 60,000 square feet (5,600 m^{2}), in exchange for maintaining the Knox Building.

In May 1994, newly elected mayor Rudy Giuliani offered financial incentives to fund the construction of the annex. This included $6.4 million in waived city and state sales taxes as well as bonds to help fund the $55 million annex and a $23 million renovation of a data center on the 1 West 39th Street side. The bank, which had been planning to move 900 data-center workers to New Jersey, decided to keep the data center in place. Giuliani's administration also offered to permit foundation work for the annex to proceed before the requisite Uniform Land Use Review Procedure for the site was completed. Though the process was completed in mid-1994, the site remained undeveloped and was used as a parking lot. The site was ultimately developed as a condominium complex called The Bryant in the late 2010s.

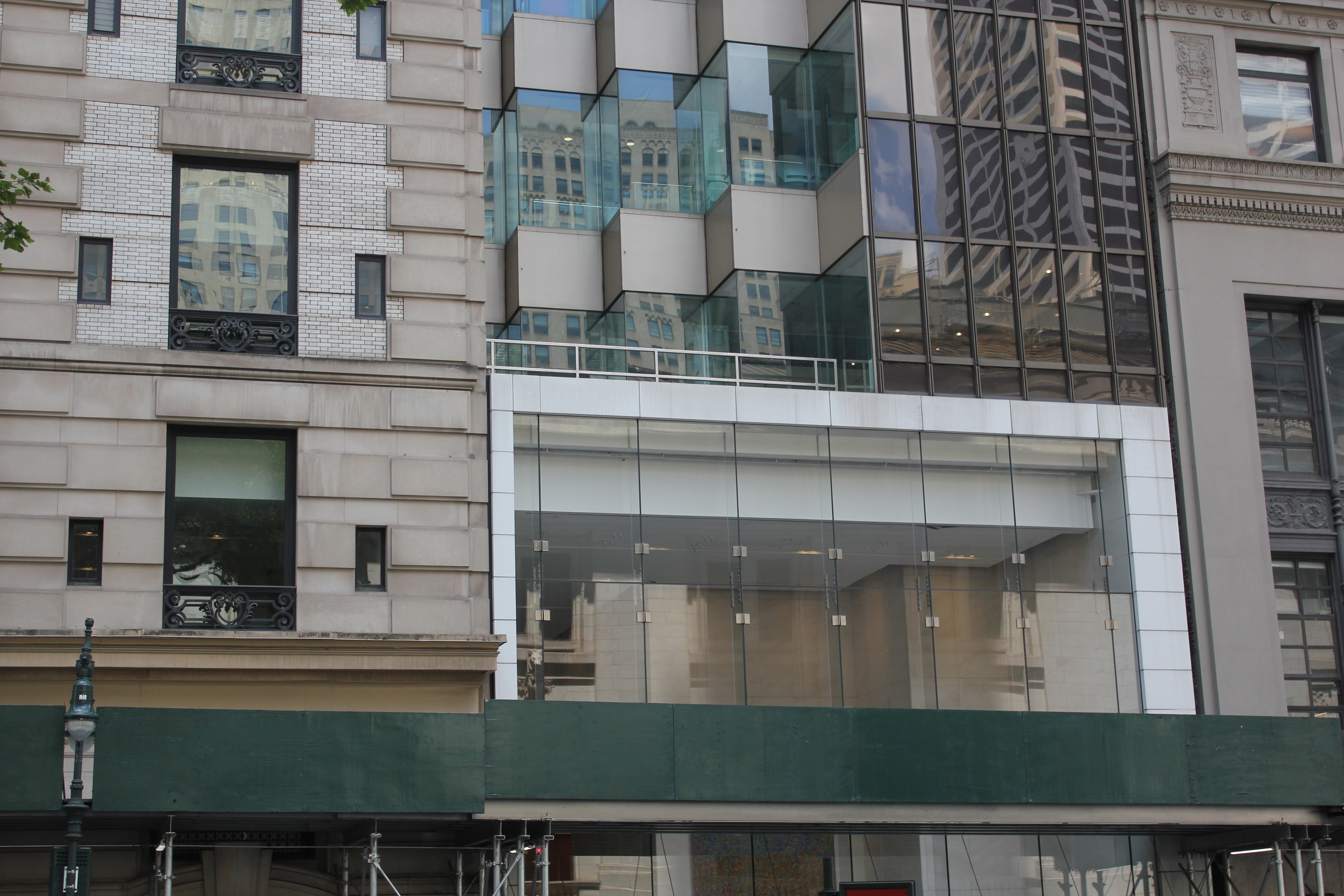
Entrance to the building on 40th Street

The expansion of the data center required the addition of 4,000 amperes of capacity, double what the data center had been able to accommodate previously. The project also included retrofitting an adjacent structure on 39th Street, dating from the 1920s. Four water tanks on that structure's roof had to be removed to make way for a 2,000-kilowatt (2,700 hp) generator and switching machinery. The loading docks were also upgraded and new electrical conduits were excavated under the street. This work had to be done with minimal interruption to electrical service, since the building was occupied for the full duration of the renovation, and all non-emergency street excavations in Midtown were halted each winter. The work was completed in the late 1990s. Tops Appliance City, an electronics store, leased space on the ground and second floors of the National Republic Bank Tower in 1998.

=== 21st century ===
==== 2000s and 2010s ====
HSBC acquired Republic in 1999. HSBC Brokerage expanded its office space at 452 Fifth Avenue in 2002, creating the HSBC Brokerage Center. HSBC contemplated selling 452 Fifth Avenue in September 2008, but the bank reneged on its plans the next month, when it received bids of between $400 and $500 million, well below its target of $600 million. By April 2009, HSBC was again considering selling 452 Fifth Avenue. Within two months, the bank had received around 20 bids of between $250 and $300 million, less than the $400 to $500 million the bank had sought, though several developers submitted bids of over $290 million. That October, HSBC Holdings sold the building to Midtown Equities and Israeli holding company IDB Group for $352.9 million. (Note: Media reports initially valued the sale at $330 million.) HSBC planned to lease back the entire building for one year and the first 11 floors for ten years. IDB then passed the building to a subsidiary, Property & Building Corporation (PBC).

When 452 Fifth Avenue was sold, investors were purchasing buildings around Bryant Park as part of a small real estate boom around the park. Rents per square foot in buildings south of 42nd Street, including 452 Fifth Avenue, had historically been lower than rents in buildings north of 42nd Street, but PBC planned to renovate 452 Fifth Avenue in the hope of being able to attract high rents. The HSBC Tower was renovated starting in 2010. As part of the work, PBDW Architects restored some of the Knox Building's original decorative elements. The first phase of the renovation, a refurbishment of the lobby, was completed in 2011, while the second phase entailed replacement of upper-story elevators and some mechanical equipment. PBC was able to sign leases for 14 of the 18 available floors during eight months in 2011, mostly to companies in the law and financial sectors. The final renovations were being completed by late 2012.

PBC refinanced the building in mid-2012 with $300 million in commercial mortgage-backed securities issued by JPMorgan Chase. The refinancing valued the building at $670 million. By 2013, asking rents at 452 Fifth Avenue were over $100 per square foot ($1,100/m^{2}), which made it among 80 buildings in New York City achieving triple digit rents. 452 Fifth Avenue was fully leased by mid-2015, amid reports PBC would sell the structure. The same year, JLL was hired as 452 Fifth Avenue's leasing agent. HSBC Bank extended its lease by five years in 2017 after searching for space in other buildings.

==== 2020s to present ====
In October 2021, PBC announced it would sell 452 Fifth Avenue and use the profits to invest in Israeli properties. That December, Andrew Chung of the Innovo Property Group announced he would acquire the building for $855 million. The sale was originally supposed to be finalized in May 2022. HSBC announced that month that it would relocate to the Spiral in Hudson Yards in January 2024. Chung had put down $30 million for the purchase but was not able to raise $200 million before the deadline. The deal fell through shortly after HSBC announced its relocation to Hudson Yards. Instead, PBC kept Chung's down payment and refinanced the building with a $385 million loan from JPMorgan Chase. The tower itself was rebranded as 10 Bryant Park.

PBC unsuccessfully attempted to sell the building again in February 2023, shortly after HBK Capital Management and Novartis moved into the building. Later that year, JPMorgan Chase sought to sell the loan that it had placed on the building. PBC's parent company Discount Investment Corporation announced in March 2024 that it wanted to pay off $400 million in debt on the tower by selling off bonds. That May, PBC paid off the building's loan with $385 million from the Tel Aviv Stock Exchange, and the owners also announced plans to renovate 452 Fifth Avenue. Amazon agreed to lease nine stories at 452 Fifth Avenue in April 2025, moving into some of HSBC's former space.

== Critical reception ==
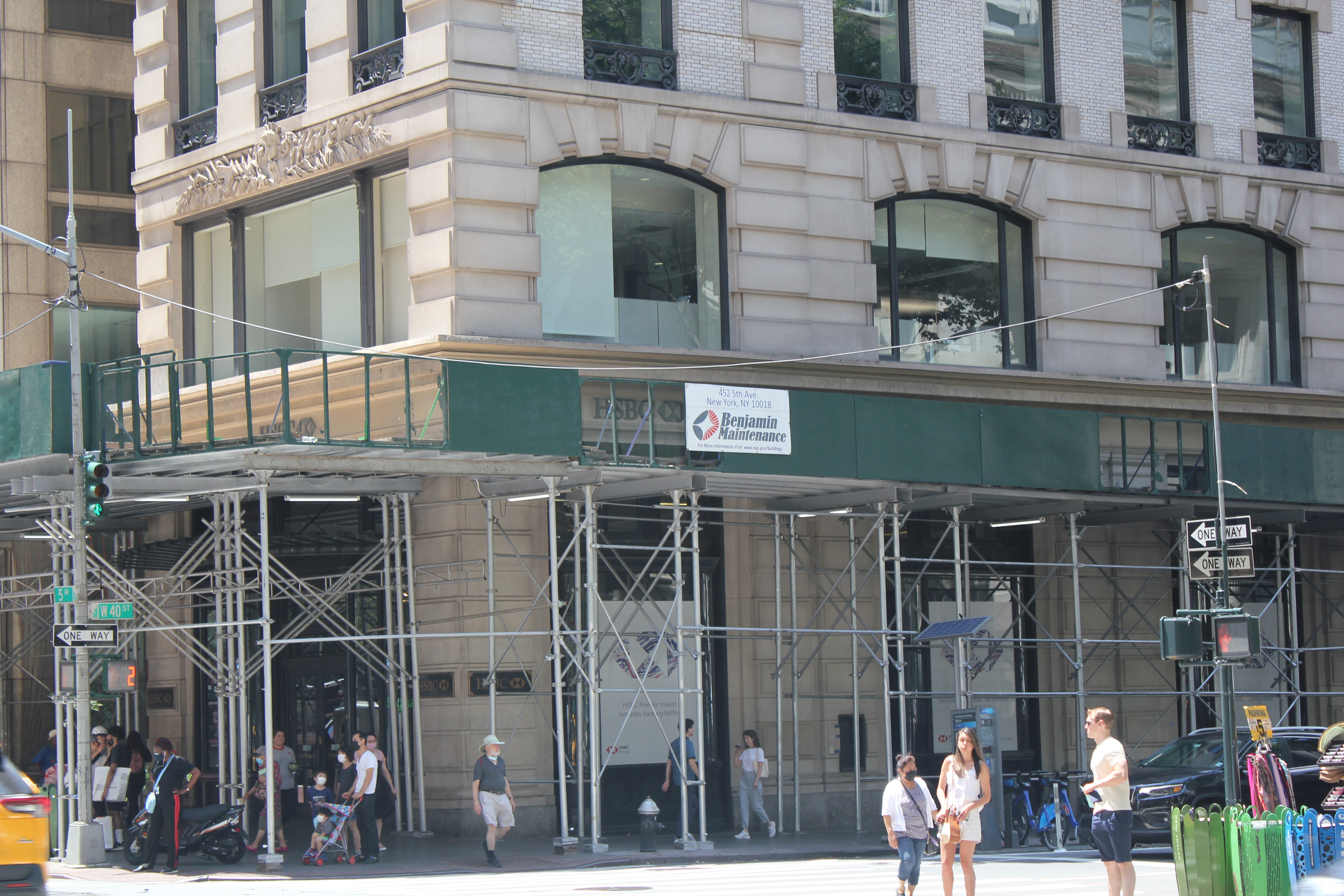
Detail of the Knox Building's ground-floor storefront at Fifth Avenue and 40th Street

Norval White and Elliot Willensky, in the AIA Guide to New York City, said the Knox Building an "exuberant Classical showcase was built for Col. Edward Knox, hatter to Presidents". After the Republic National Bank offices opened in the Knox Building in the 1960s, architectural writer Ada Louise Huxtable praised the building as having been "beautifully restored", with the design complementing the New York Public Library Main Branch. She described the interiors as having "a kind of Beirut Louis XVI atmosphere out of Beirut".

When the Republic National Bank Tower was being constructed, Paul Goldberger praised the Knox Building as a "lyrical classical gem". By contrast, he believed that, despite the measures taken to incorporate the Knox Building into the tower's design, "the tower bears down over the old building, turning this strong classical structure into a quaint little toy". When the second annex was built in the 1990s, Peter Slatin wrote for The New York Times that the first tower "exemplifies the now largely discarded approach to designing buildings that clearly denote their separateness from their historic setting". Christopher Gray wrote for The New York Times in 2010 that the Knox Building "makes the sumptuous New York Public Library [main building] look positively demure".

== See also ==
- List of tallest buildings in New York City
- List of New York City Designated Landmarks in Manhattan from 14th to 59th Streets
- National Register of Historic Places listings in Manhattan from 14th to 59th Streets
