= The Bryant =

Residential building in Manhattan, New York

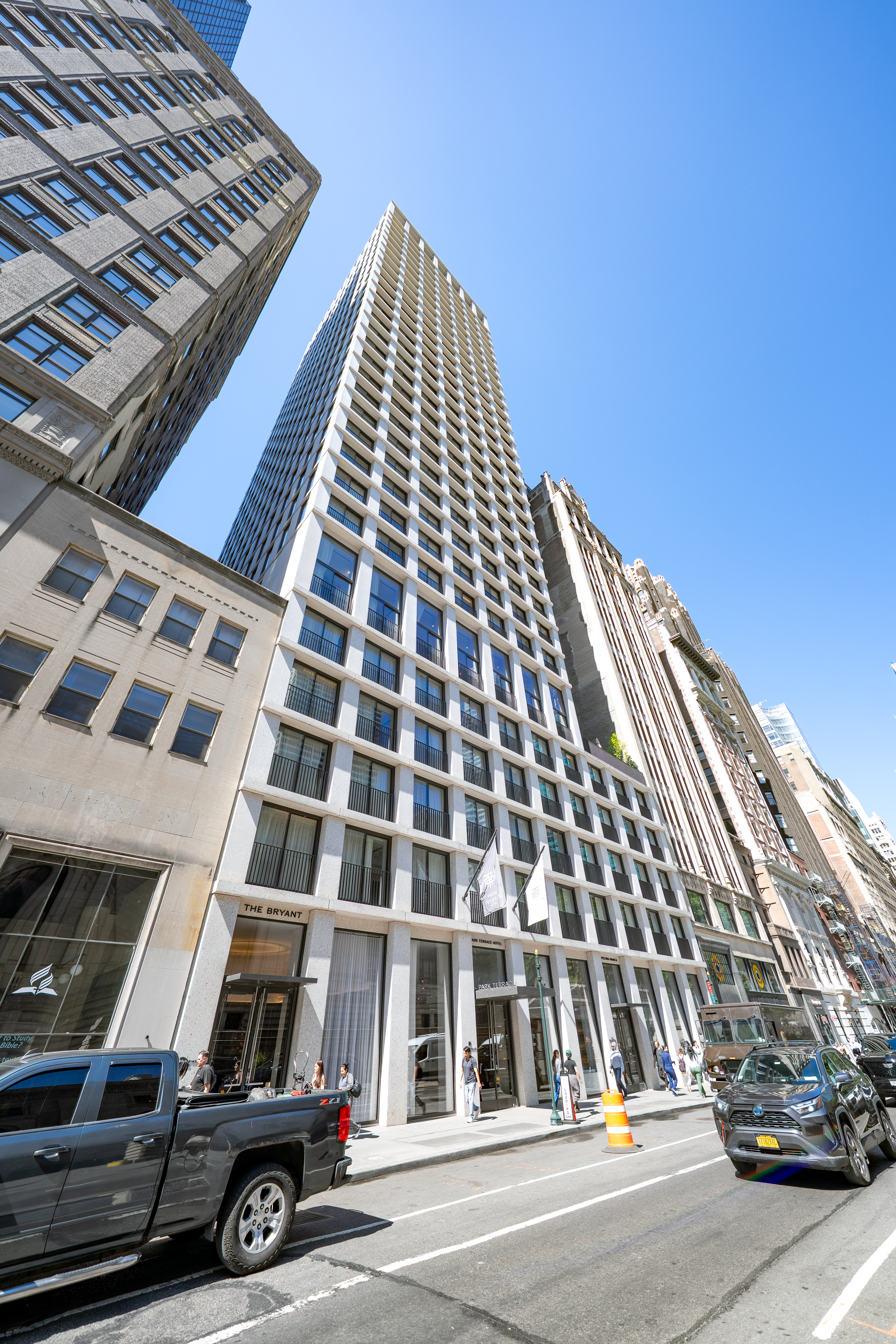
- Interactive map of the The Bryant area

General information
- Location: 16 West 40th Street, Manhattan, New York City
- Coordinates: 40.752447°N 73.982986°W
- Completed: 2018

Height
- Architectural: 402 feet (123 m)

Design and construction
- Architect: David Chipperfield

The Bryant is a residential building at 16 West 40th Street, south of Bryant Park, in Midtown Manhattan, New York City, developed by HFZ Capital Group and designed by the firm of architect David Chipperfield. The building topped out in 2016, and construction ended in 2018.

== History ==
The city first approved plans for the building in 2007. HFZ announced Chipperfield's role as architect in 2015, in the same press release that disclosed the development's name. The announcement also disclosed that the building would have both condominiums and a luxury hotel. The site formerly held a parking lot, and constituted the final undeveloped plot on Bryant Park.

The developers of the nearby Bryant Park Hotel sued HFZ over the use of the name "The Bryant".

== Architecture ==
HFZ solicited plans from architectural firms including Morris Adjmi and Spivak Architects before settling on Chipperfield. The facade is made of precast, polished concrete, a choice Chipperfield made so that the structure would be aesthetically distinguished from new construction that employs glass as its facade. The New York Times referred to the facade as "[...] a touch that promises to make the building stand out". The precast material features marble and sandstone chips in various colors. The colors of the inserted materials reference nearby buildings. Chipperfield's firm also designed the interior, which features herringbone floors. The facade extends into the building's residences.

Though The Bryant is Chipperfield's first ground-up commission in New York, he previously designed the interior of the Bryant Park Hotel, inside the American Radiator Building, which neighbors The Bryant.
