= Granitschale im Lustgarten =

Granite bowl located in Berlin

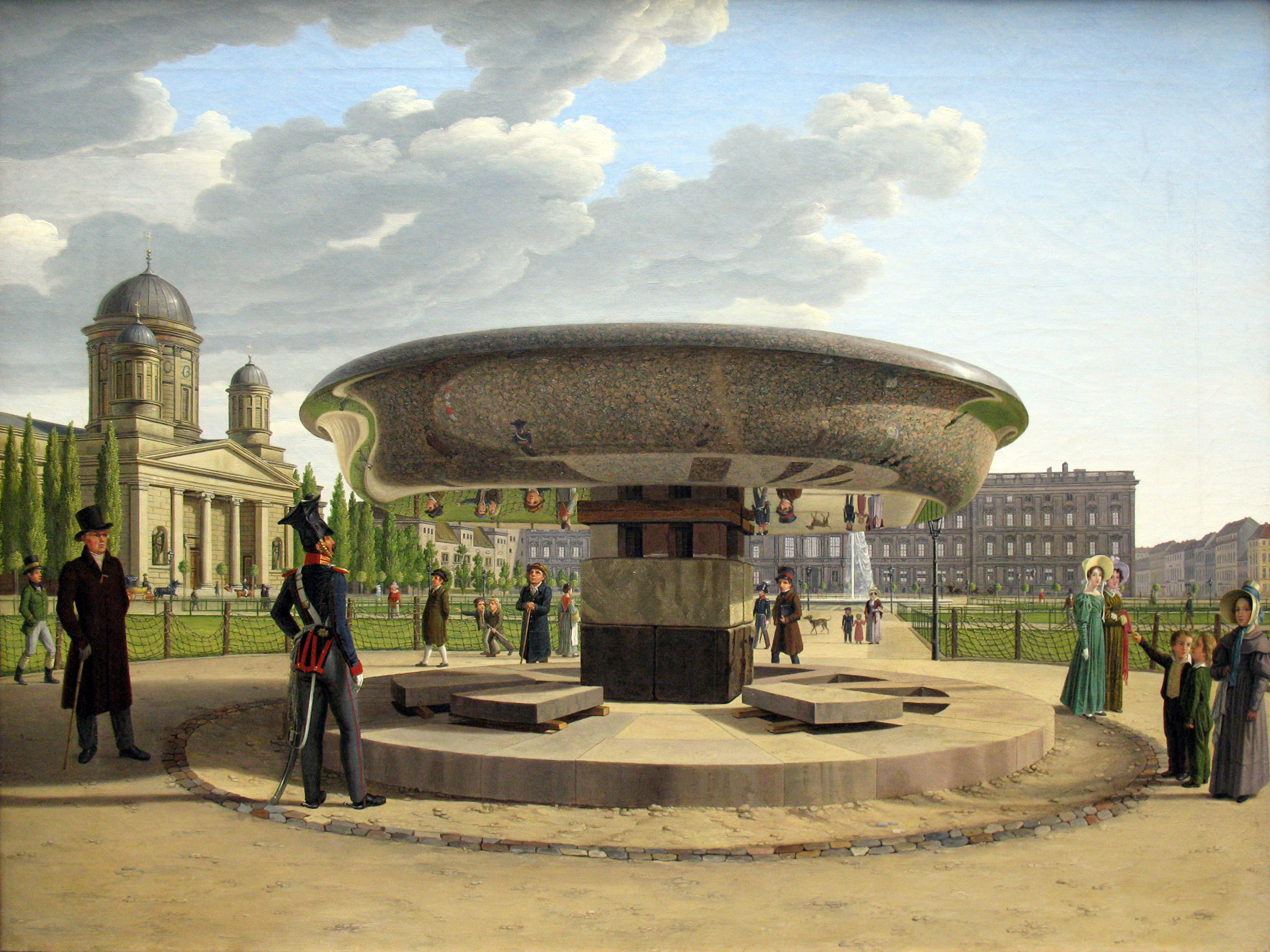
Johann Erdmann Hummel: The Granite Bowl in the Lustgarten, 1831, Altes Museum Berlin

The Great Granite Bowl in Berlin's Lustgarten (German: Granitschale im Lustgarten), which is located in front of the Altes Museum, has a diameter of 6.91 meters and weighs approximately 75 tons. With a circumference of 69^{1}/_{7} feet (approximately 21.7 meters), it is considered the Biedermeier Wonder of the World and is the largest bowl carved out of a single stone in existence.

Initially commissioned by Prussian King Frederick William III, the granite bowl was placed in the museum's rotunda. Since it proved to be larger than originally planned, it was eventually installed in front of the museum. The bowl, which the artist Johann Erdmann Hummel represented in a number of sketches and paintings, was not only regarded as a technical marvel at the time but also as a "patriotic symbol," "cult stone," and "myth."

== History ==
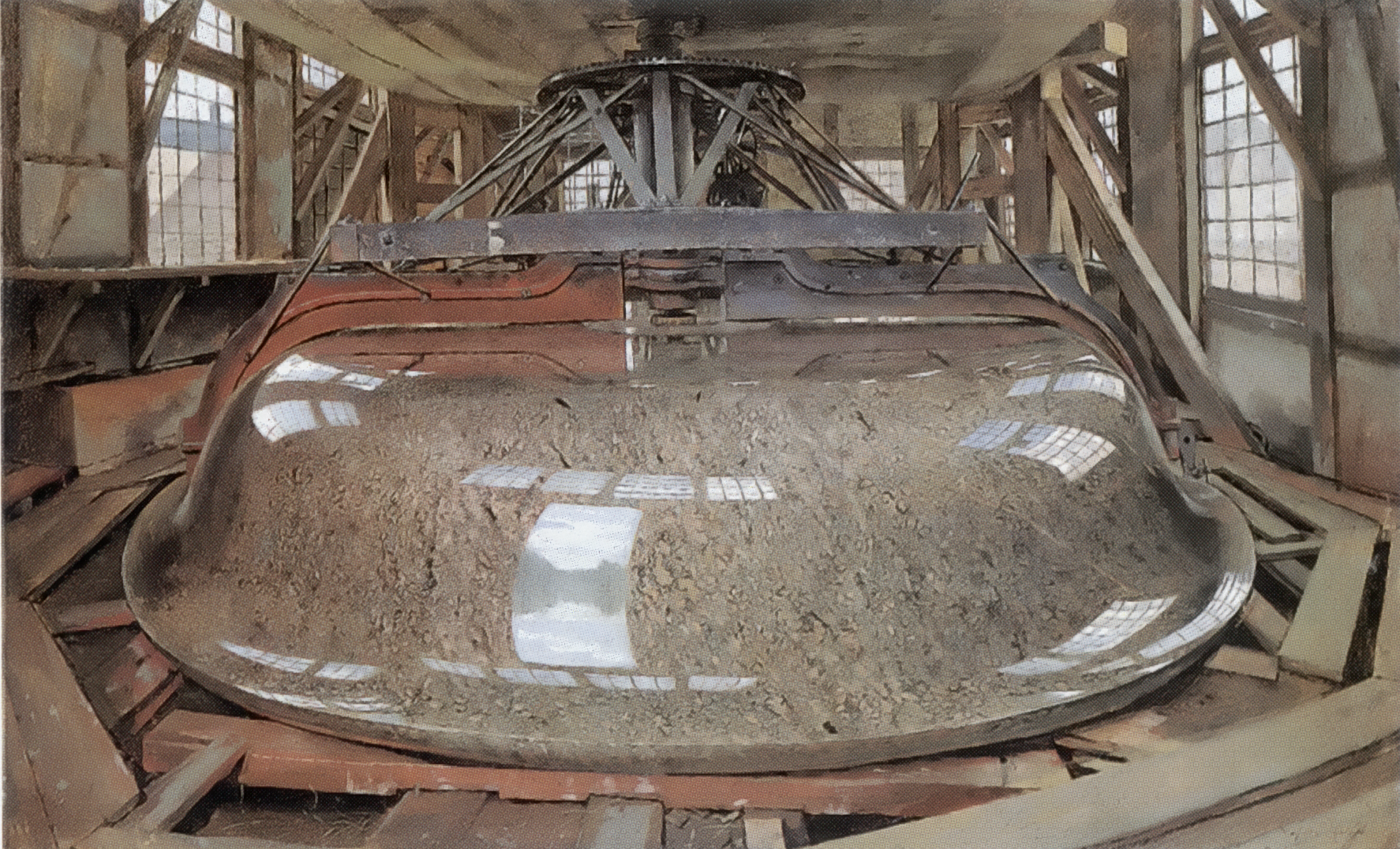
Polished granite shell in the grinding plant driven by steam

At the 1826 Academy Exhibition in Berlin, stonemason and building inspector Christian Gottlieb Cantian displayed a circular granite bowl measuring 6 feet (1.83 meters) in diameter and two smaller stone bowls. William Cavendish, the 6th Duke of Devonshire, was impressed and ordered one of the stone bowls. Upon hearing of this, Frederick William III of Prussia commissioned Cantian to create a similar granite bowl that would surpass the English version in size. The king declared that "the largest producer of the species should remain in the country." Cantian delivered a 17-foot (5.34-meter) diameter bowl, which he claimed would be even more impressive than the "magnificent porphyry bowl from Nero's Golden House in the Sala Rotunda of the Vatican." To "make it more receptive to the enjoyment and knowledge" of the collection, the Prussian Chief State Architect Karl Friedrich Schinkel intended to install this bowl in the rotunda of the Altes Museum, which was then still under construction.

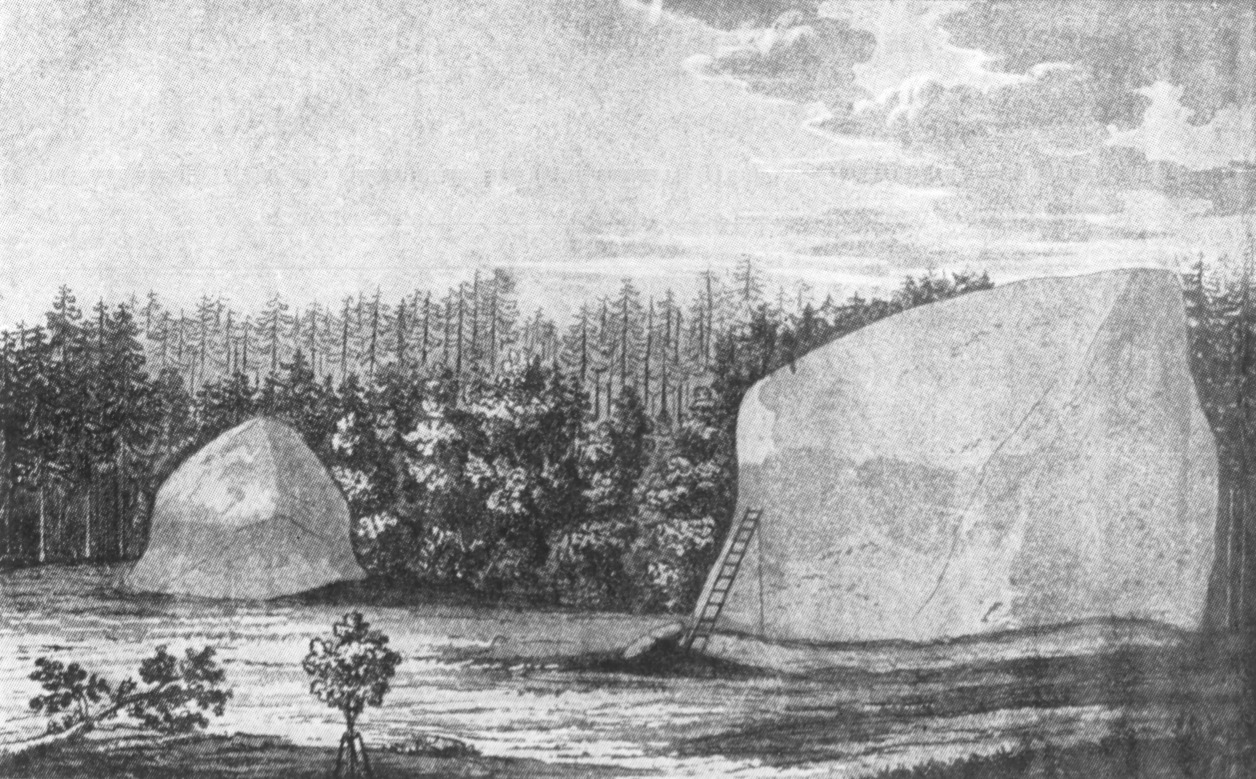
The Great and the Small Margrave Stone in a depiction from 1821

Initially, Cantian had his sights set on a 600-ton granite block near the Neuendorf school district in Oderberg and had already begun splitting it in 1825. However, due to its brittleness, he abandoned this block and instead selected the Großer Markgrafenstein, a massive erratic boulder estimated to weigh between 700 and 750 tons and believed to be 1.42 billion years old. The Saale or Weichselian Ice Age carried this erratic boulder, composed of red Karlshamn granite, from Karlshamn in central southern Sweden to the Sandberg in the Rauenschen mountains where it rests alongside several other massive stones.

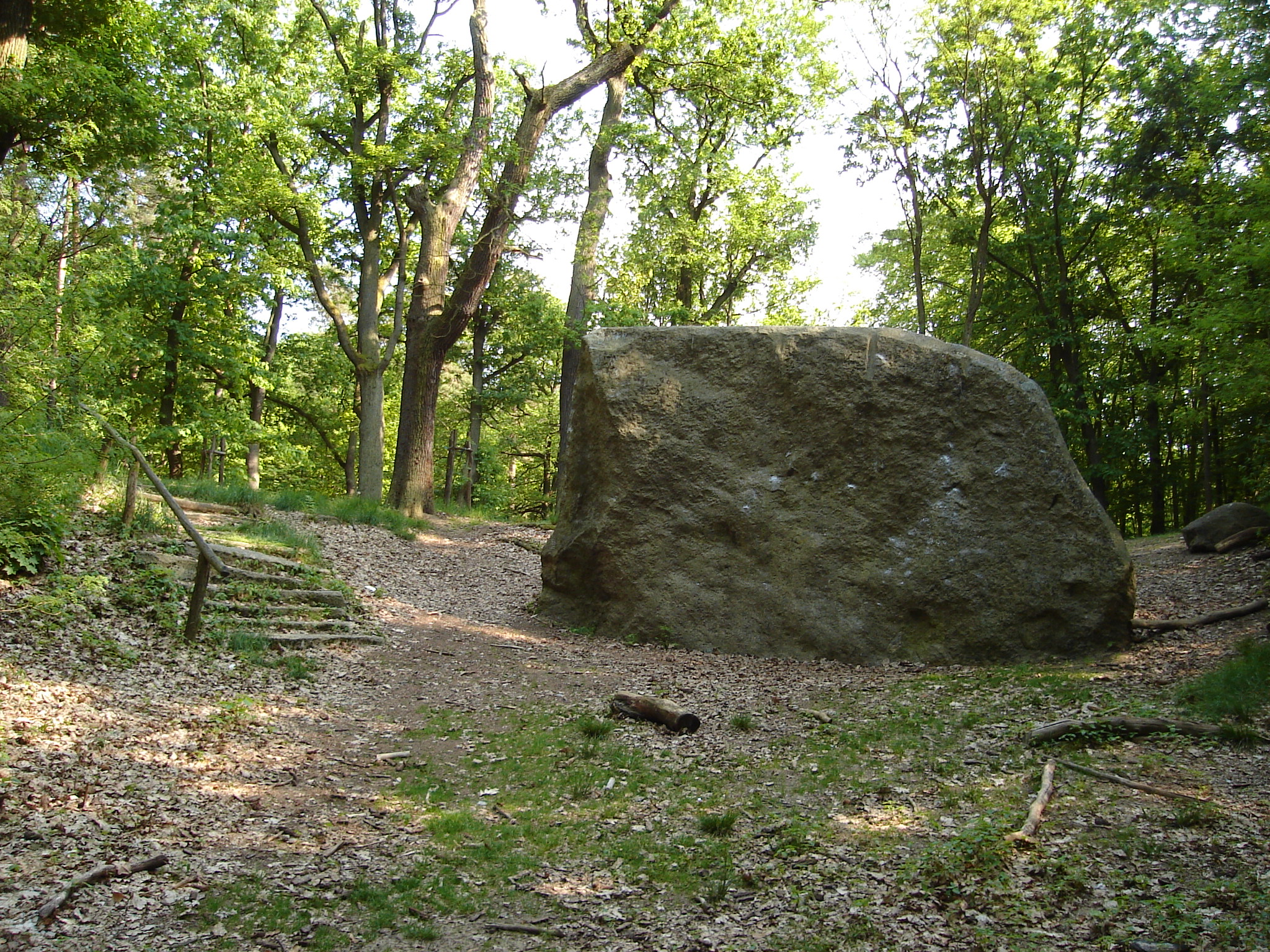
The rest of the Great Margrave Stone, 2005

In September 1827, the blank for the granite bowl was split from the larger of the two margrave stones. Cantian informed the king that a shell size of 22 feet (6.90 meters) was possible, following a successful split, and sought direction on how to proceed. The king opted for a size of 22 feet. This presented Schinkel with a dilemma: the bowl was intended to be the centerpiece of the rotunda, but a bowl of this size would be aesthetically detrimental to the room. The bowl could no longer fit inside the rotunda. Schinkel suggested that the bowl be placed in a semicircle in front of the museum's staircase and provided the king with designs of the rotunda with the various-sized bowls for his consideration. After several presentations by Schinkel, the monarch finally approved the outdoor display on February 21, 1829.

=== Granite as a national symbol, cult rock, and myth ===
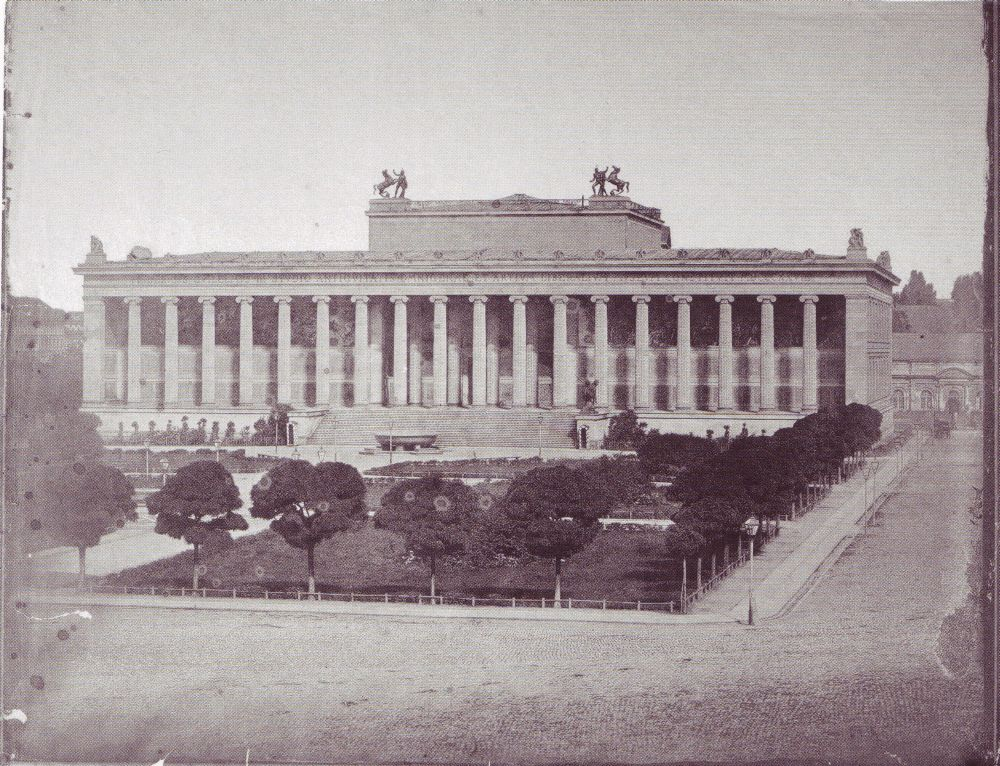
Granite bowl and museum, before 1854

In the pre-and post-Napoleonic eras, as nation-states emerged, leaders created publicly visible symbols that demonstrated their greatness, influence, and power. According to this style of thinking, historical architectural structures from Egypt and other ancient locales were dismantled and placed in modern-day European metropolises. If one did not benefit from it or desired more, new objects were created, such as the Berlin bowl. Sibylle Einholz, who was commissioned in 1997 to clarify the ownership of the granite bowl, places the Biedermeier world wonder in a wider context. The prior consideration of the Great Granite Bowl as a Biedermeier wonder of the world, as a technical marvel of the processing and transport of the bowl by Cantian, and as an artistic appreciation by the painter Hummel was inadequate. He also considers granite as a "patriotic symbol," "cult stone", and myth" in the Biedermeier era. Furthermore, the placement of the bowl had a particular significance.

=== Patriotic symbol ===
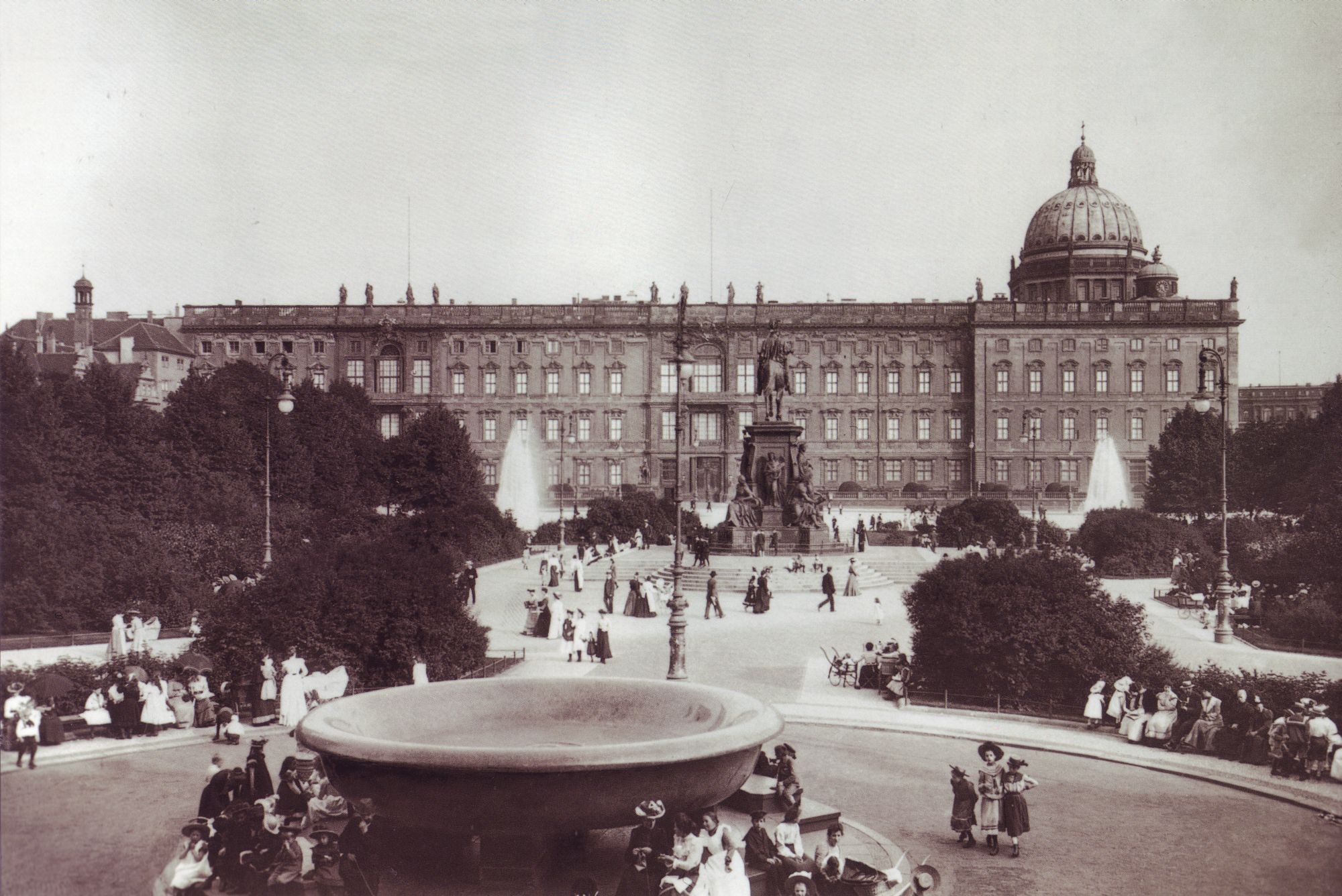
Lustgarten with bowl in 1913, in the background the city palace

Sibylle Einholz suggests that during the Biedermeier era, granite was not only admired for its exterior appearance but was also attributed to human qualities. Due to the difficulty of working with and polishing granite using the standard tools and methods available at the time, granite became a symbol of power and perseverance. This is evident in the decision made by Friedrich Wilhelm III during the selection of the design for the Luther Monument in Wittenberg in 1818, where he insisted on a granite pedestal to represent Luther's unshakeable firmness.

Granite boulders during the Biedermeier era were not only thought to possess human-like characteristics but also were seen as patriotic symbols. Johann Gottfried Schadow wrote to Goethe in 1818 regarding the Blücher memorial at Rostock, stating that "the nine-foot (2.82-meter) pedestal of patriotic granite" could only be executed in Mecklenburg granite. Goethe saw his earlier argument in his essay "Granitarbeiten in Berlin" (1828), that the large erratic blocks were remnants of large rock masses that had disintegrated into themselves, validated. Cantian referred to his work as "patriotic granite" in the academy's exhibition brochures. Einholz noted that the "national index" for the proposed Blücher mausoleum was the "largest bowl from the largest granite find." The planned Blücher mausoleum, which would have had a dome 4.25 meters in diameter and been built of a granite rock called "Blücherstein" and modeled after Theodoric's tomb in Ravenna, failed to achieve comparable monumentalism. Silesian Zobtenberg should be reconsidered. The 650-ton granite block could not be delivered due to technical issues, so this failed altogether.

The granite boulders located in the area were glorified as national symbols during the Biedermeier period. The worship of granite was demonstrated, among other things, by the fact that the King of Prussia purchased granite without specifying a reason. All parts of the Margraviate Stone were put to good use.

=== Cult stone, myth, and site ===
According to Sibylle Einholz, there was a detectable ambivalence towards conventional cults in the Biedermeier era, which is why granite was characterized as a "cult stone" at the beginning of the 19th century. Wilhelm von Humboldt acquired the two porphyry tubs from the Diocletian Baths ruins in Rome in 1810 for the museum with the intention of using them as sarcophagi for the royal family. It was deliberate to draw comparisons between Florentine Medici burial customs and Roman antiquity. This claim is supported by other evidence:

"Both the stone porphyry and the color purple were relatively rare and thus already reserved by the Romans for the emperors (for example, for sarcophagi made of porphyry). This tradition has been inherited in many later cultural circles, e.g., Byzantine art, the German Empire under the Hohenstaufen dynasty, bishops of the Christian Church, and, perhaps last, the Medici in Florence."

In addition to their shared mineral composition, porphyry, and granite share a reddish hue. Christian Gottlieb Cantian was aware of the existence of the porphyry bowl, and despite his desire to create an even more "magnificent" bowl, he recognized the similarities between the two stones.

Sibylle Einholz concludes that the proposal for the Blücher monument to be located on the Zobtenberg, also known as the "Holy Mountain of Silesia," where Celtic and Germanic cult sites had existed since the fifth century, was created by Schadow but proved to be unworkable. Einholz draws on Goethe's 1828 essay on granite to support this conclusion,

"that the granite is to be understood as a nucleus, as a carrier of primordial information about the formative rule of the earth. The poet speaks of the dignity of the rock, which is not only the foundation of our planet, but at the same time the highest and the deepest. To the noble rock – precious stone – is appropriate only processing to the exquisite solitaire."

Initially, the installation of the bowl was planned in the most visible place within the museum, and the change directly in front of the entrance of the museum suggests that there is a deep connection to this place. The bowl not only contributes to the museum's architecture but also conveys content. According to Einholz's reading of Goethe,

"that elsewhere he conceived of the museum as a kind of new sanctuary to which man goes on pilgrimage, we must attribute a special aura to the objects on display."

Beyond that, he sees a supra-temporal connection:

"The picture cycle literature about the development of life on earth [...] planned in the vestibule would correspond to the basic idea about the shape of the earth as a geological quintessence set in a granite solitaire – whether in the rotunda or in front of the flight of steps remains the same."

=== Preparation of the Granitschale (Granite bowl) ===
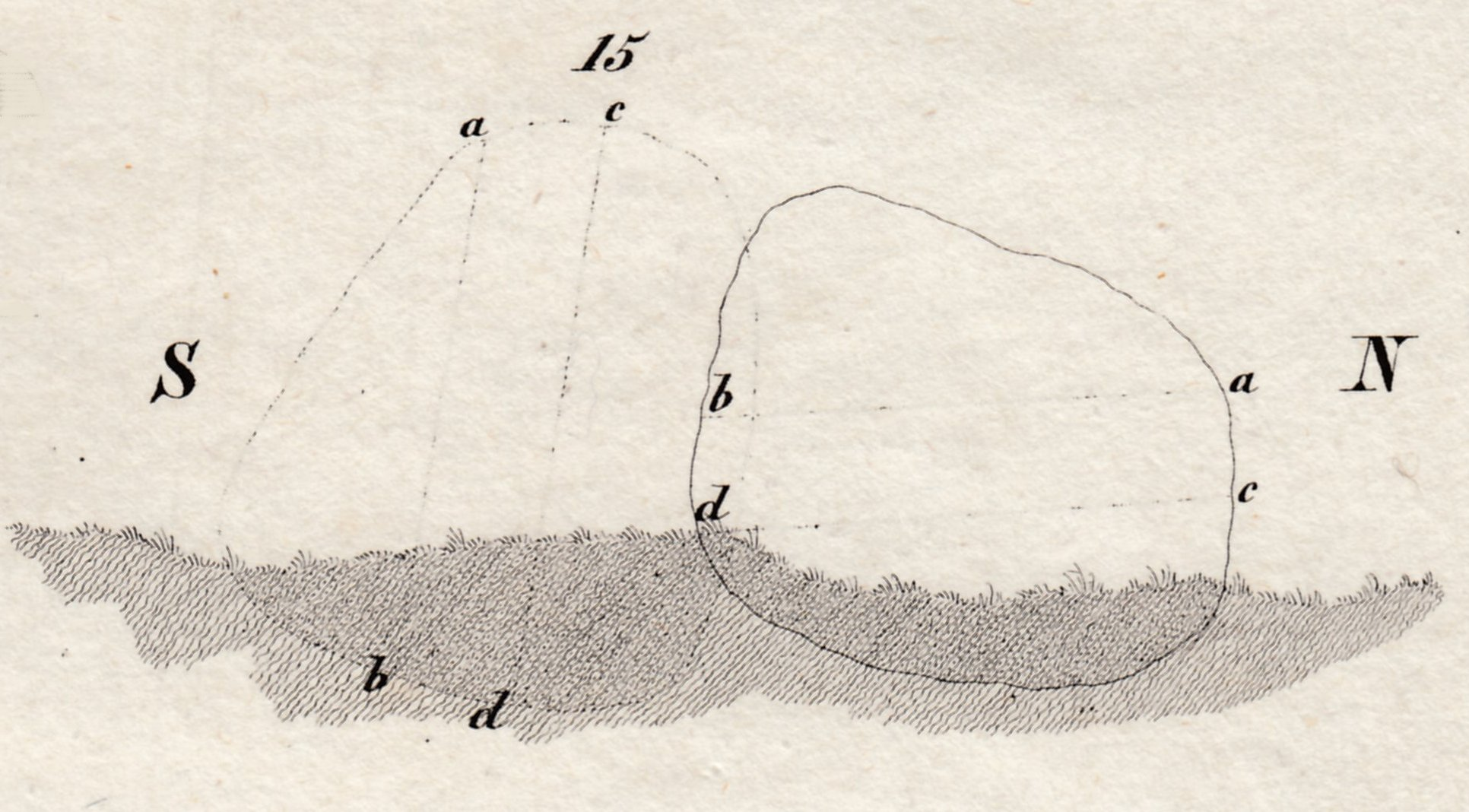
Great Margrave Stone: N = original location, S = after approximately 90° rotation, ac or bd = 5 feet (1.57 meters) thick blank process description under stone splitting.

The public showed great interest in the processing of the blank, transportation, and grinding of the bowl in Berlin, which was documented by the painter Johann Erdmann Hummel. He created several oil paintings and sketches to capture the process. One photograph of the partially completed bowl being turned in Berlin was destroyed during the Second World War and was housed in the Märkisches Museum. Hummel was not interested in the bowl's symbolic meaning. In addition to the precision of the painted image's perspective and reflections on the bowl's bottom, it is worth noting that one of Hummel's paintings features Cantian, the gentleman wearing the top hat, as well as Hummel's sons and their cousin.

=== Stone Splitting ===
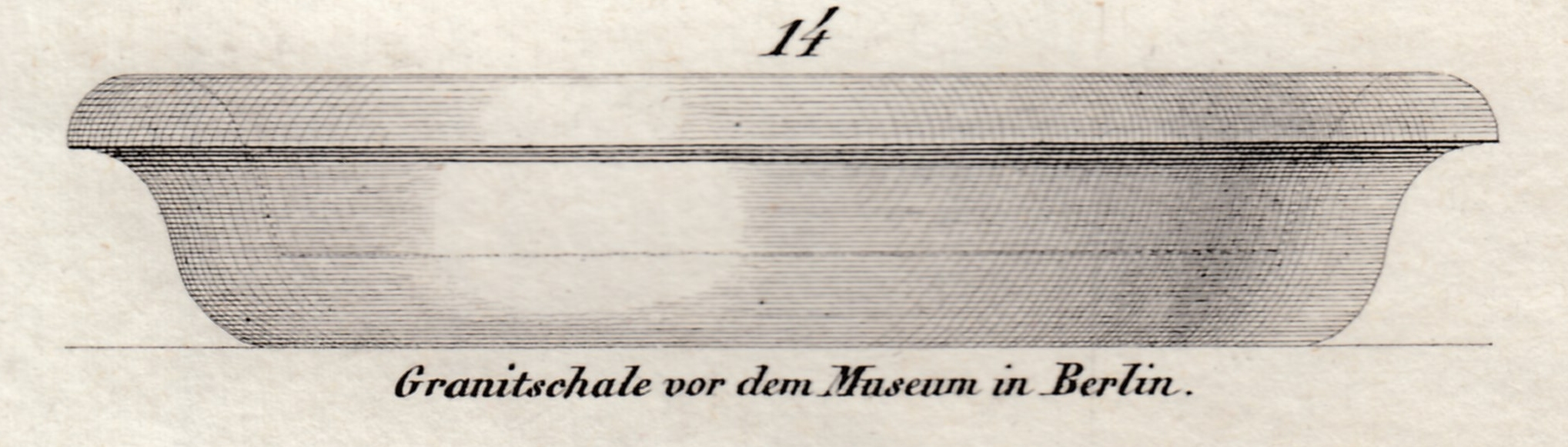
Profile of the bowl

Work on the bowl began in May 1827, with 20 stonemasons working every day. The Margrave's Stones' stonemasonry tools were shaped and hardened by one or two blacksmiths.

By mid-June, the Großer Markgrafenstein which weighed approximately 700–750 tons and measured 7.8 meters in length, 7.5 in width, and 7.5 in height, had been turned 90 degrees using ten winches (shown in Fig: from N to S). This was a necessary step to optimally split off a correspondingly large piece of stone on August 24, 1827, which was achieved with the use of 95 iron wedges.

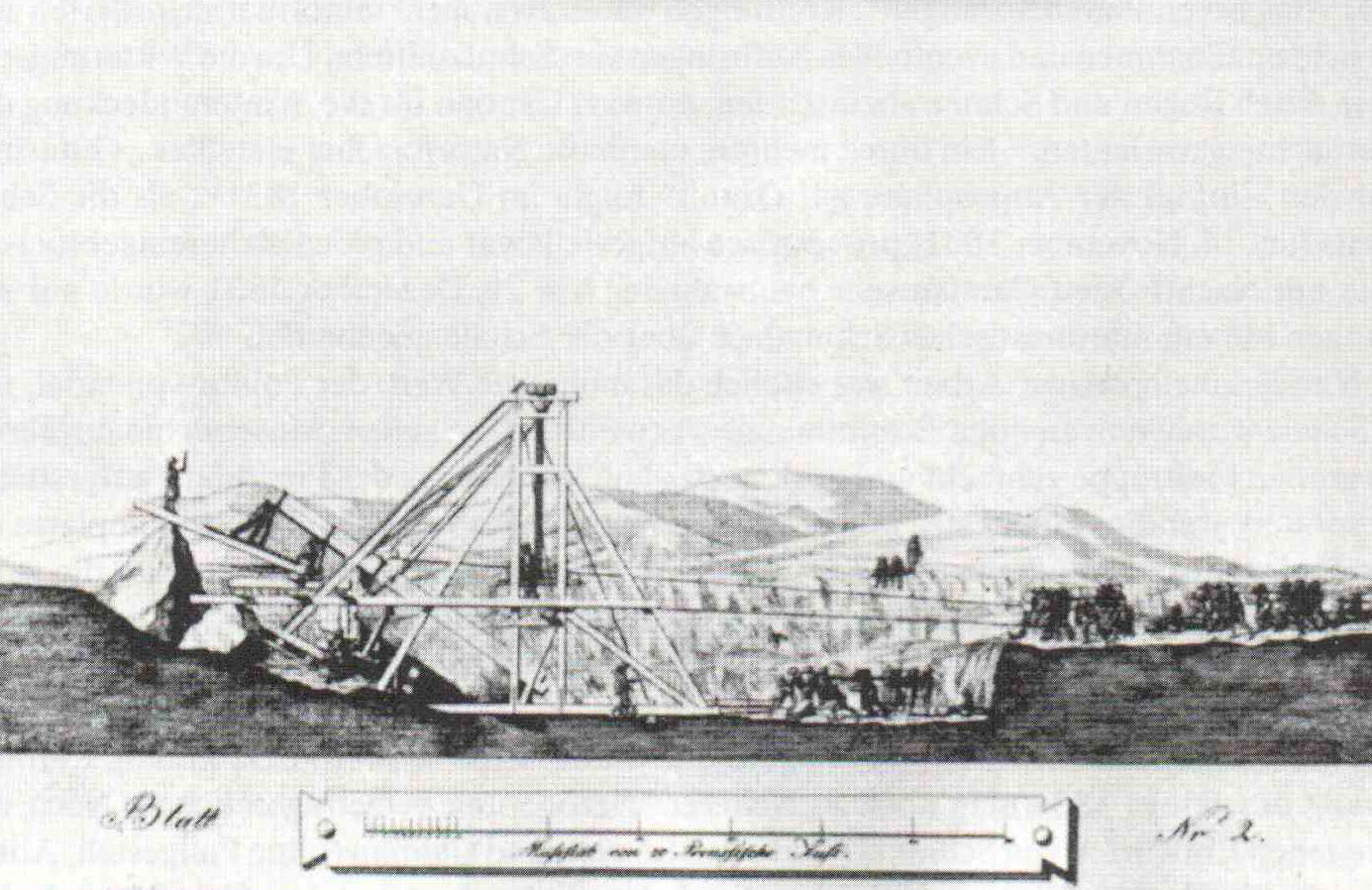
Pen and ink drawing by Cantian: Turning the bowl in the Rauen Mountains. The bowl body is visible on the sketch on the left about 30° slanted as a light beam; it is supported by several men. On the left, on the top of the rock on a beam, Cantian has probably depicted himself again, giving the commands to the workers on the winches on the right and those below on the right.

The first splitting of the stone did not go as planned, resulting in the need to remove larger stone protrusions with hand tools. A second attempt in early November also failed, requiring further removal of stone protrusions by hammer and chisel. It was not until December 23, 1827, that the 5-foot thick stone slab (shown in the diagram as bd-ac) was finally turned to work on the underside of the bowl (shown as ba down). Turning the 225-ton slab required 100 workers and 23 hoists. Once the underside was finished on April 26, 1828, the hollowing of the bowl continued until August 4.

=== Transport and finishing ===
It is interesting to note that during the construction process, workers would sit on the edge of the shell for breakfast. This was possible due to the shell's impressive dimensions, which allowed for such activities. By mid-September 1828, the production of the profiled shell exterior and additional work on the shell was completed. Special transport preparations, such as the construction of a wooden beam frame, were also finished by this time.

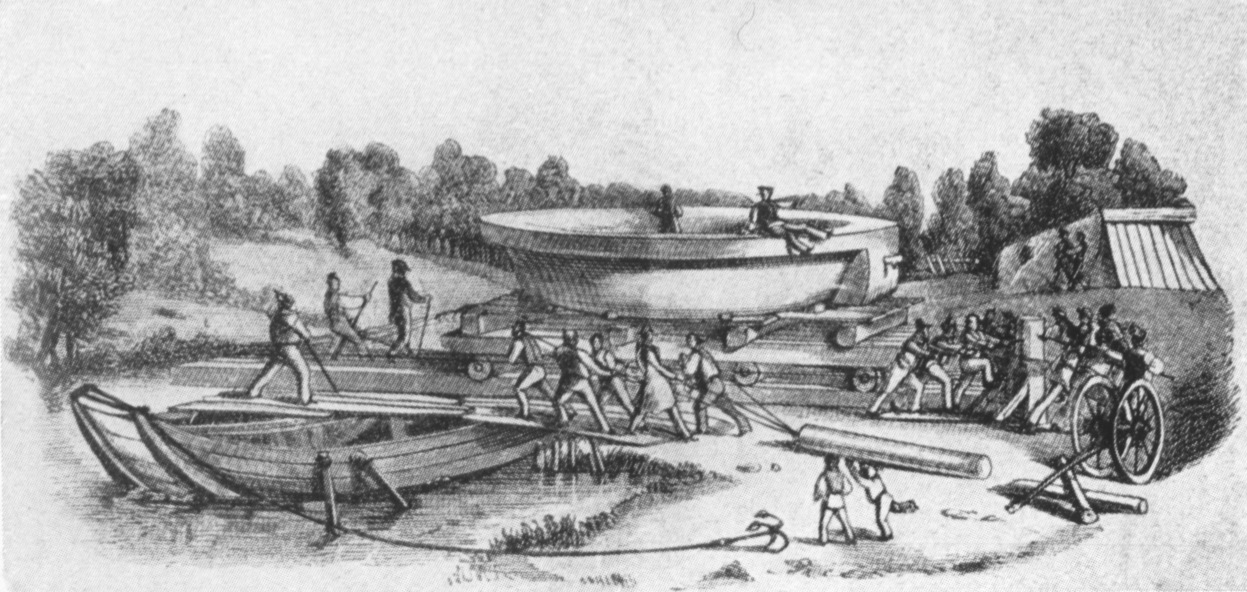
Ship loading of rough granite shell resting on a wooden frame

The bowl, which weighed between 70 and 75 tons at that time, was transported to the Spree River using wooden rollers. A boardwalk and a road through the forest to the Spree were constructed; the route is still recognizable today. The transport took six weeks; daily progress was 600 feet (188 m). To put the shell onto a wooden ship that had been properly braced for this task, 54 workers were required.

Due to the shell's massive size, it was transported with a rough surface as it would have been too costly to finish and polish, and protecting it from scratches and damage during the lengthy delivery trip would have been challenging. Therefore, it was only finished according to its outer form. The shell's transport to Berlin required the Grünstraße Bridge to be significantly reduced in height to accommodate its size.

On November 6, 1828, the bowl was delivered to Berlin and transferred to a specially constructed building at the Packhof, located not far from the installation location at the Altes Museum. To achieve a high gloss finish, the bowl underwent two and a half years of grinding and polishing, using a steam engine with ten horsepower inside the building.

It was the first time in Germany that a stone this hard was polished with machine help, and the polishing of curves and cavities added to the challenge.

It was found that during the grinding process, the shell had three cracks. The cause of these cracks is believed to be either natural forces or the splitting of the Rauen Mountains. In 1831, the shell was studied by prominent naturalists of the time, including Klöden and Wöhler, at Cantian's request, and was kept covered during the winter. It is assumed that one of these cracks, deepened over time by frost action, led to the shell's eventual breakage in 1981.

=== Lineup ===
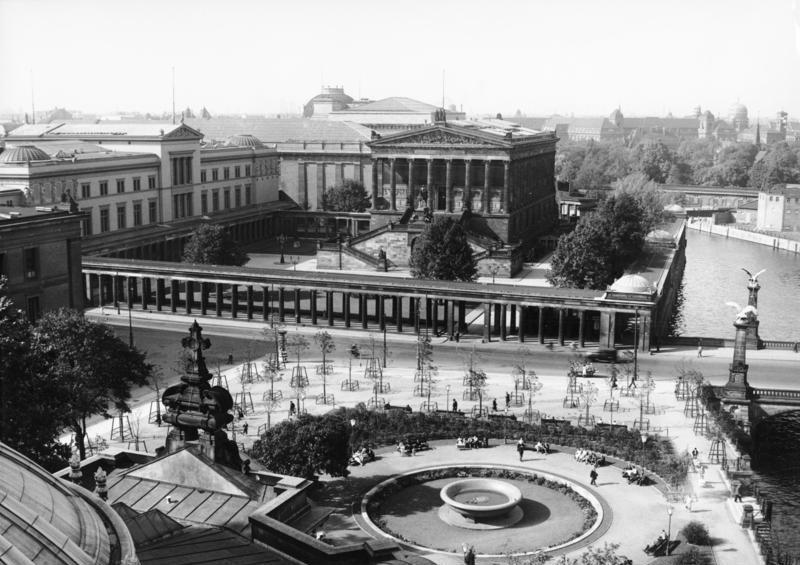
View from the cathedral to the National Gallery with the granite bowl moved here, around 1938

The museum opened in 1830, and there was a disagreement over where to place the bowl between Cantian and Schinkel. Cantian proposed placing the bowl on high columns, while Schinkel preferred placing it close to the ground on plain granite pedestals in front of the museum staircase. Ultimately, the king sided with Schinkel, and the bowl was placed on three plinths, allowing a view into its interior. On November 14, 1831, the bowl was provisionally placed, and it was officially handed over to the Royal Museum on November 10, 1834. The estimated price for the bowl was 12,000 thalers, but it ended up costing 33,386 thalers, which was only officially approved after a revision.

In the course of the transformation of the Lustgarten into a parade ground in 1936, the granite bowl was moved to the green area north of the cathedral.

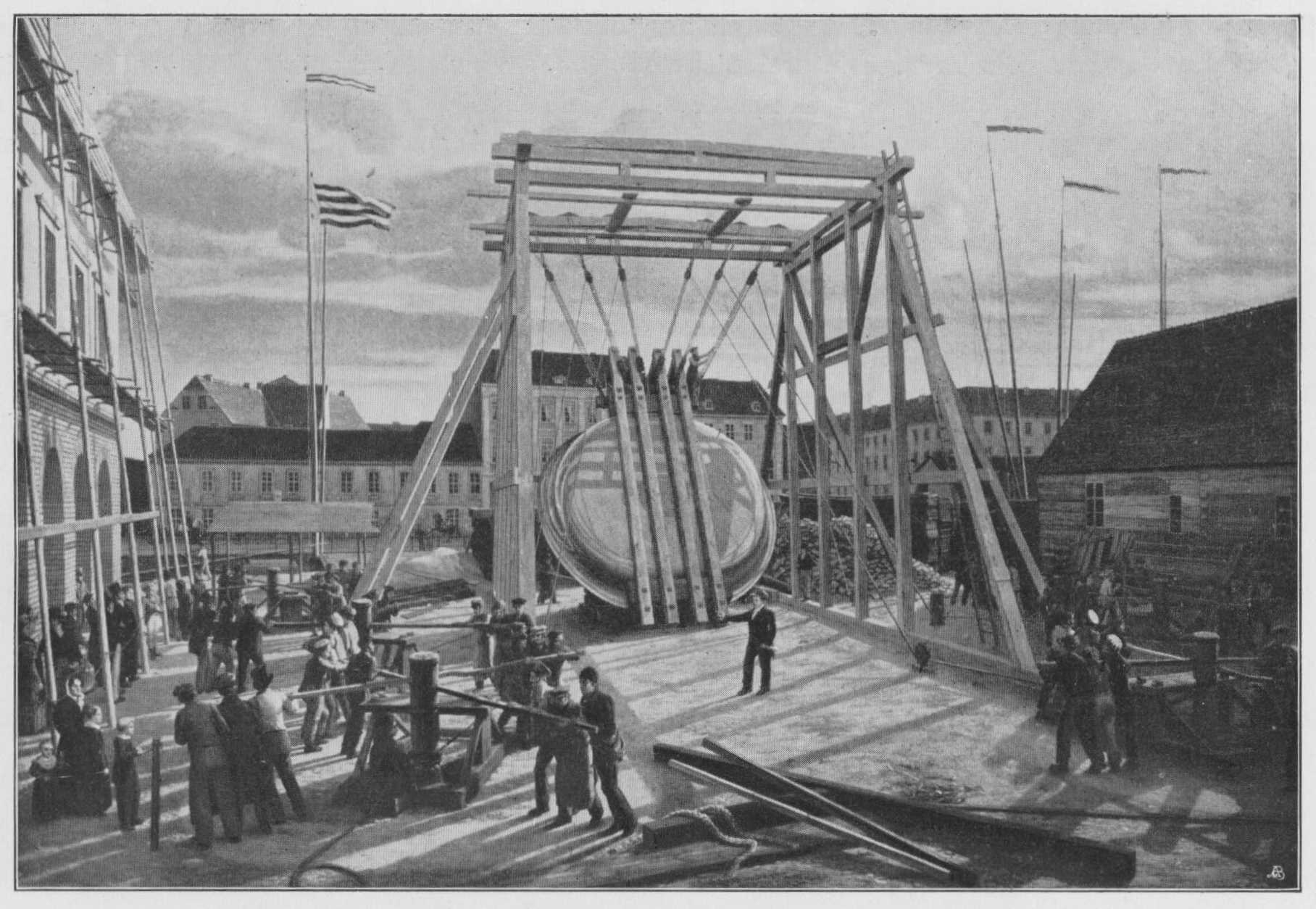
Turning the shell over in Berlin after polishing the underside. The winches can be seen in the front left.

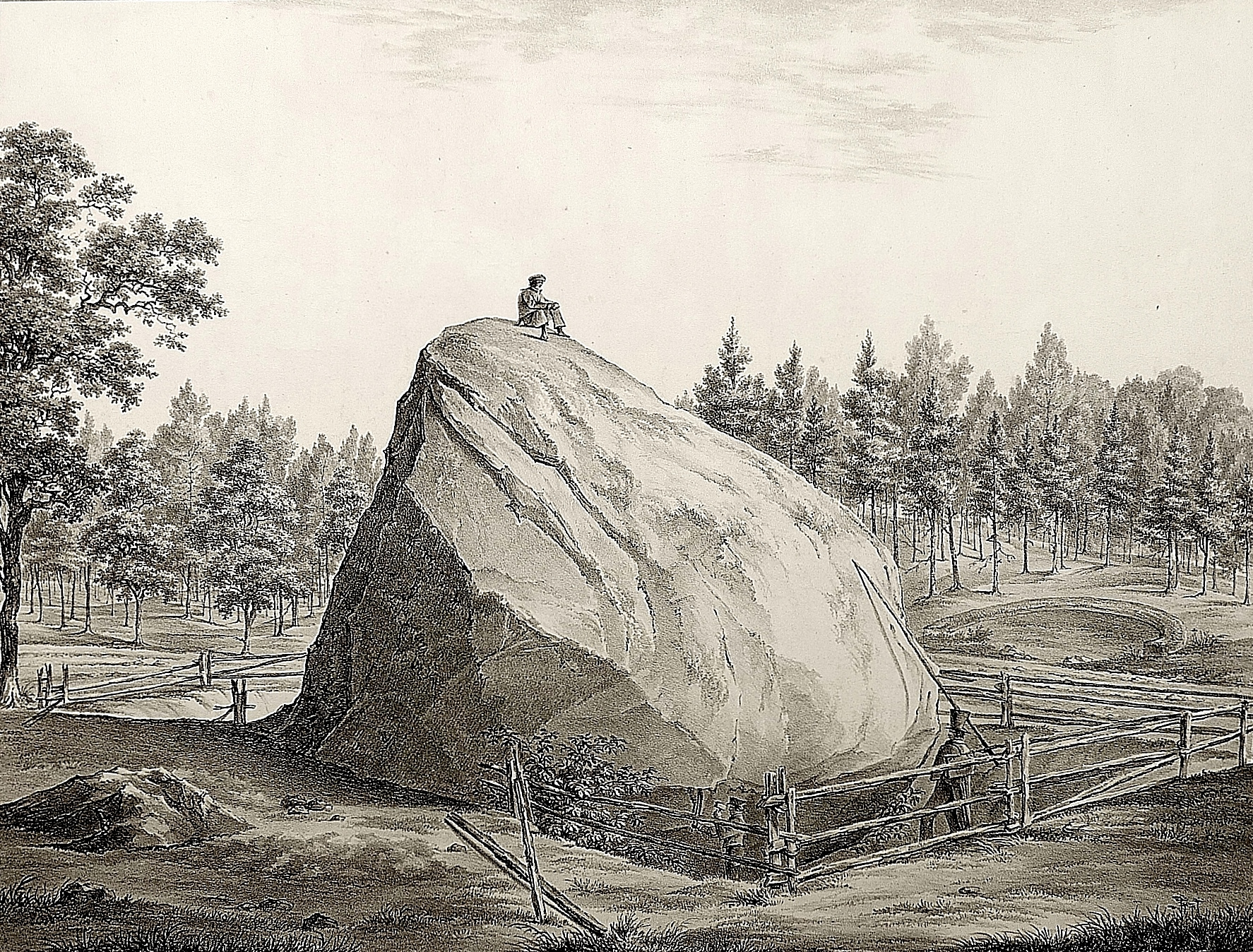
Lithograph of the Great Markgrafenstein by Julius Schoppe as it was still visible at Pentecost 1827

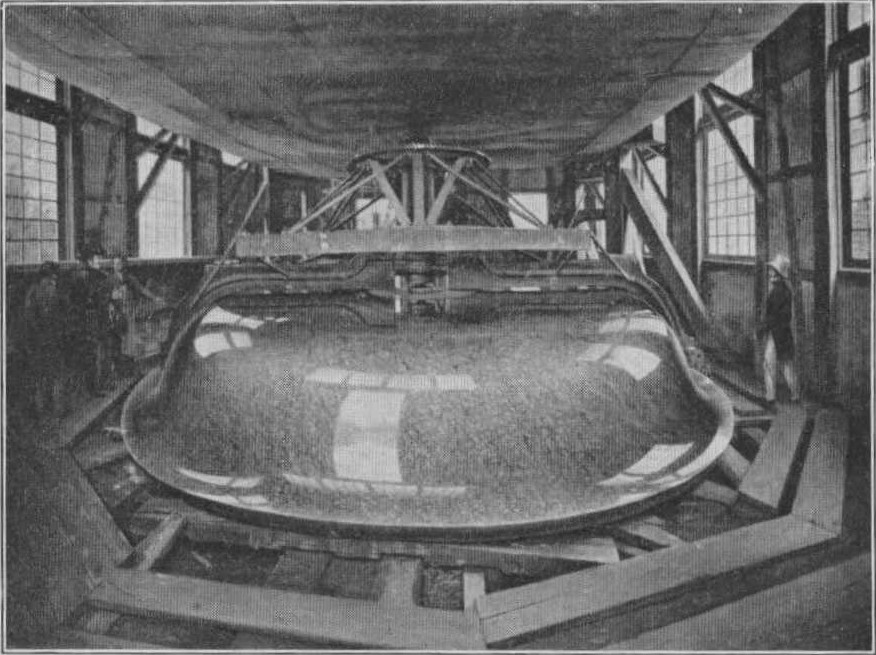
Illustration of the grinding system with a bogie, whereby the grinding frame had the outer negative shape of the outer shell

== Condition and naming ==
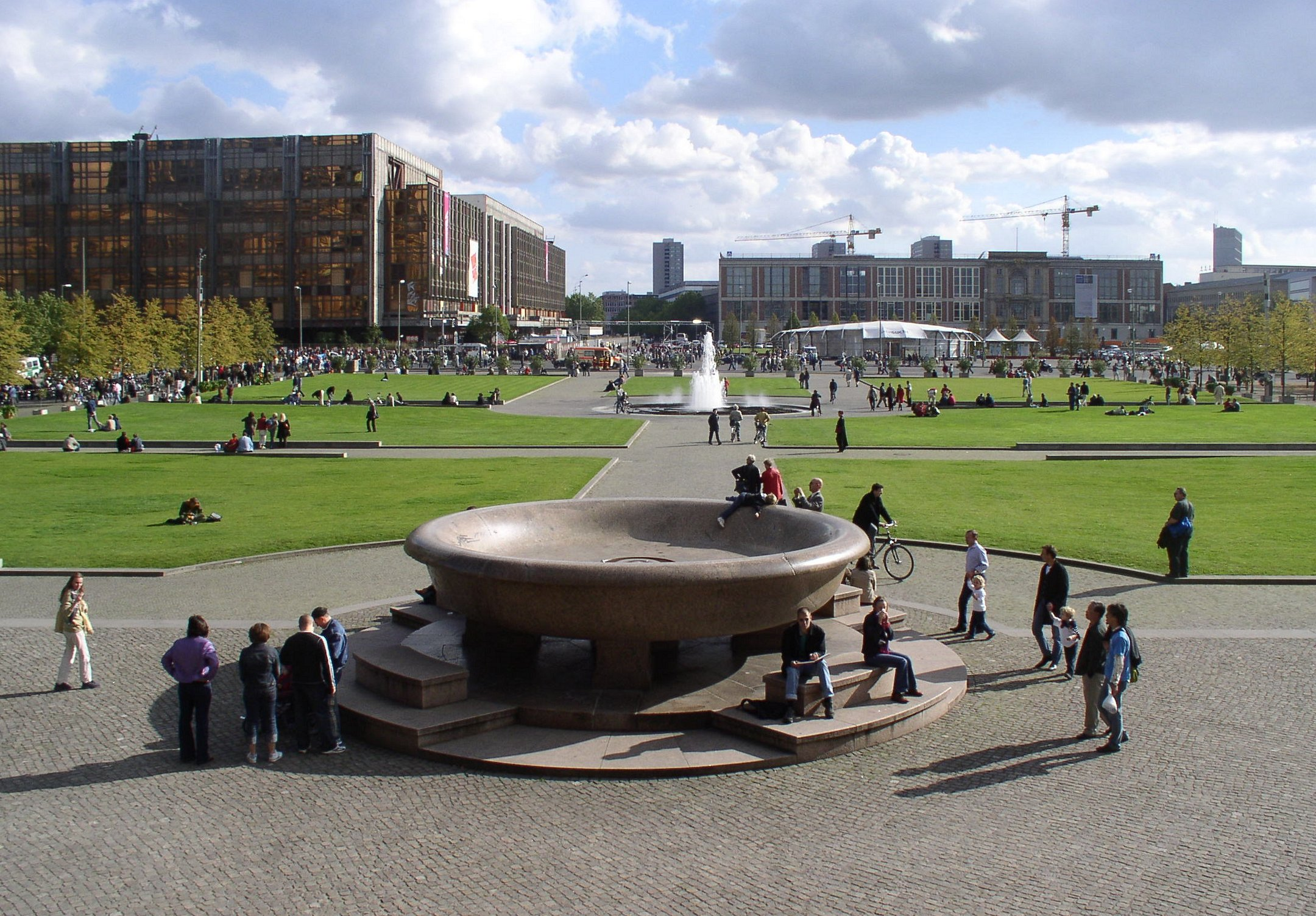
Shell in 2004 (from left: Palace of the Republic and State Council building of the GDR)

Johann Wolfgang von Goethe mentioned the polishing of granite, expressed admiration for the granite bowl measuring 22 feet (6.9 m) in diameter, and called it a "granite basin." The bowl was known as the "soup bowl" by Berliners. Later, the work of art was nicknamed the "Biedermeier Wonder of the World." However, due to its size, the bowl could not be placed in its originally planned location in the rotunda within the Altes Museum. As a result, it was exposed to the weather and suffered from improper handling while in a public space. During the Weimar Republic, the site was the scene of rallies and marches, and the bowl was used as a viewing platform, resulting in scratches on its surface.

In 1934, the bowl was moved north of the cathedral because it was in the way of the Nazis' marches, and they paved the square. During the Battle of Berlin in World War II, it was damaged by shell fragments. In the GDR, the Lustgarten became part of the newly developed Marx-Engels-Platz. The bowl was kept for a while between the barracks of the Berlin Cathedral Construction Works before being returned to its original location in 1981 in honor of Schinkel's 200th birthday. A larger defect at the edge of the bowl, which was caused by the effects of war, was repaired with a so-called crossing of red granite (see illustrations).

After spending nearly 190 years outside, the bowl's polish has deteriorated. An oil painting from 1831 by Johann Erdmann Hummel depicts the bowl's original, mirror-smooth surface. The bowl is now a protected monument. In October 2020, young individuals spray-painted it with offensive graffiti, which was seen throughout Germany and prompted harsh criticism from cultural authorities.

Repairing damage to the granite bowl
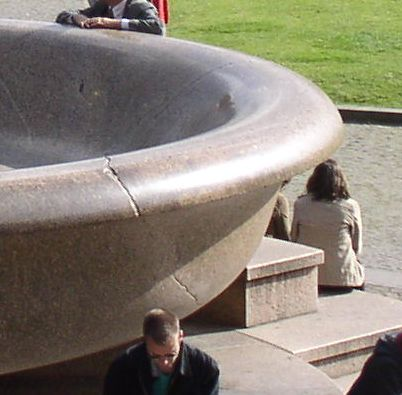
Cracked shell

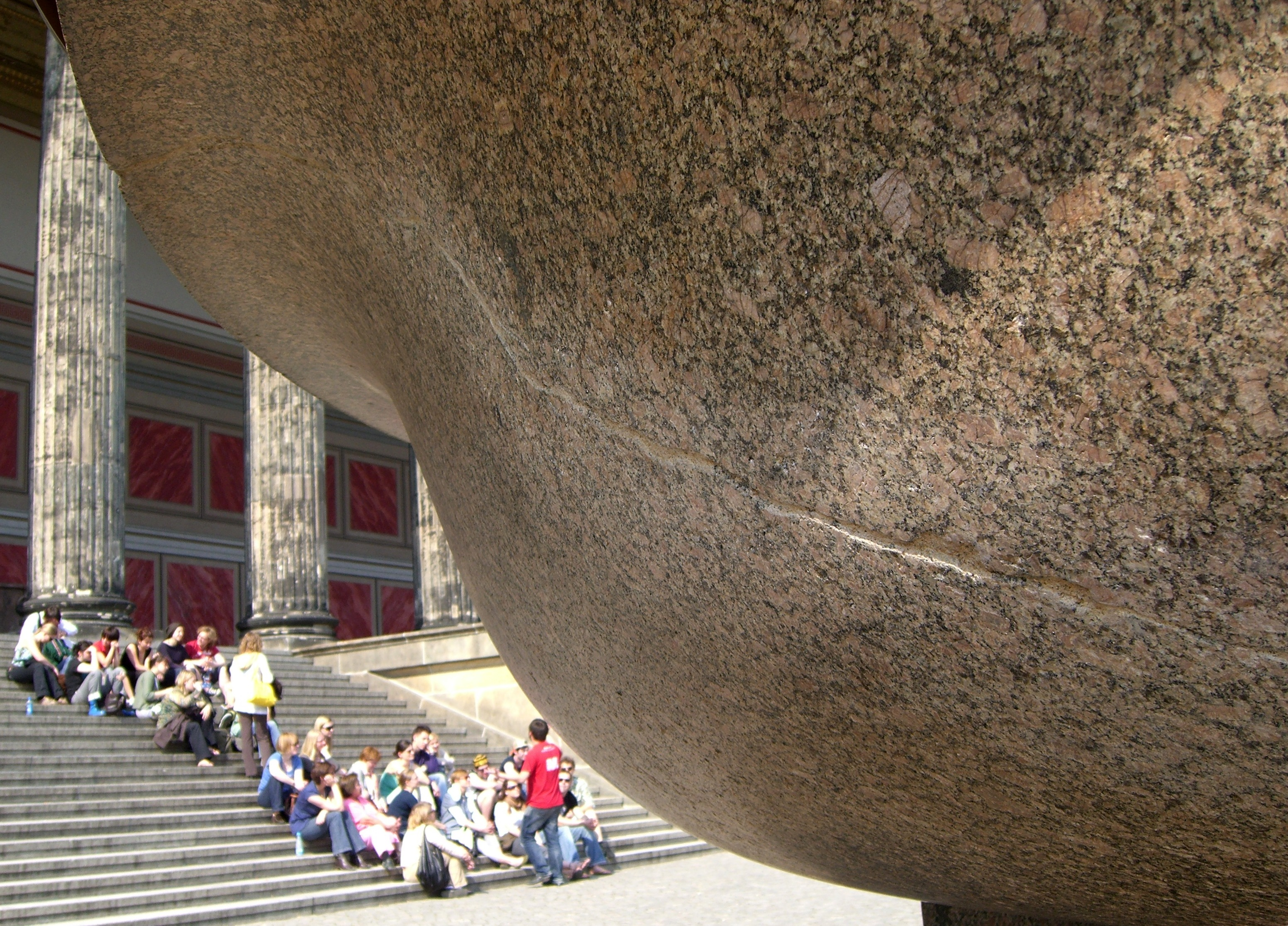
Detailed view of the profile and the filled crack

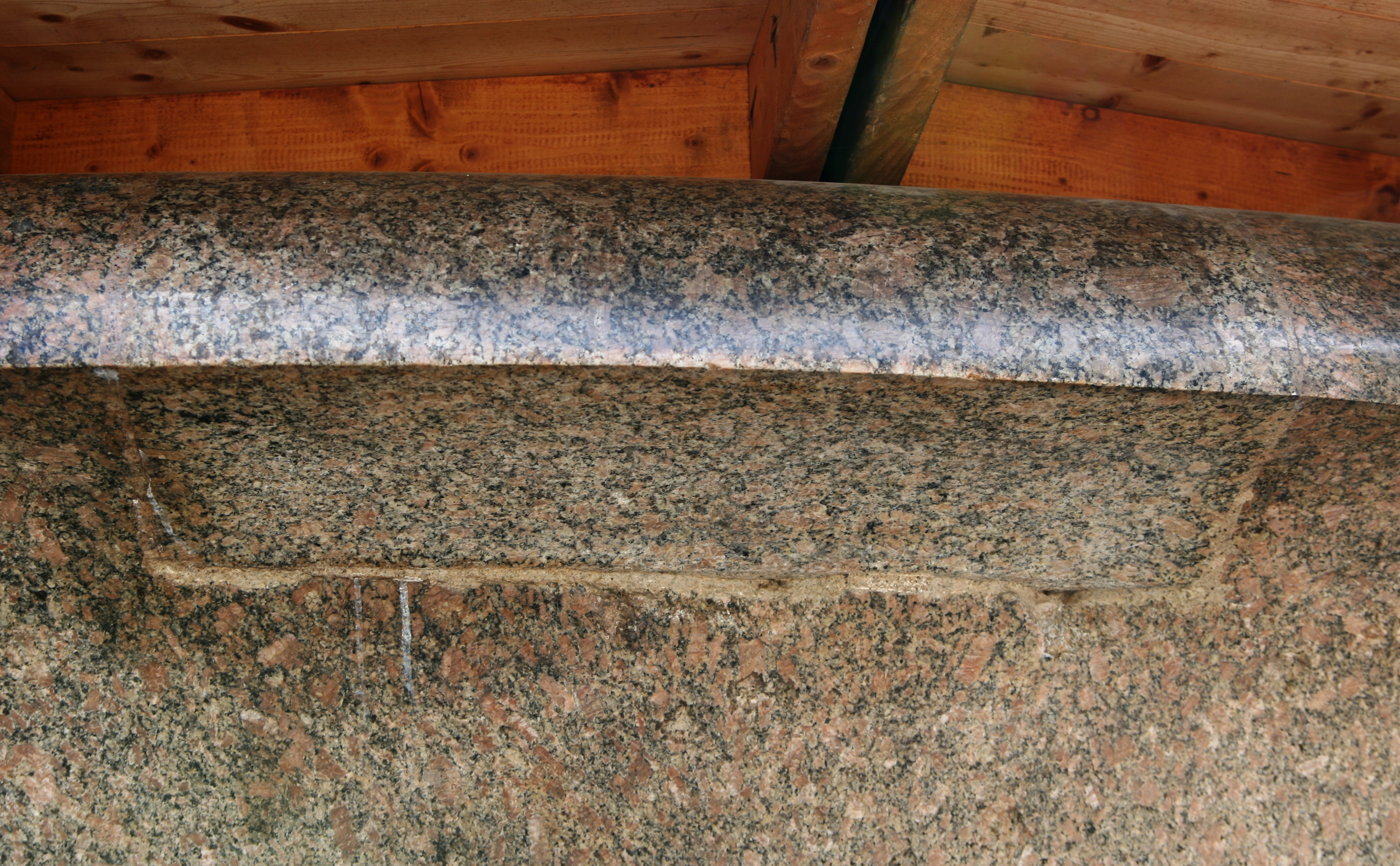
Replacement piece ( crossing ), a repaired war damage

== Used rock material ==
During the remodeling of the Lustgarten between 1997 and 1999, the grey Lusatian granite base was replaced with a reddish French granite. The granite bowl and the three bases are made of southern Swedish Karlshamn granite, which belongs to the Precambrian geological era. The plinth framing, on the other hand, is made of Rose de la Clarté granite from the Carboniferous period, which originates from Brittany. The plaster around the bowl is made of a combination of Triassic Oberdorla shell limestone sourced from the Thuringian village of Oberdorla and Chinese graywacke.

== More large stone bowls ==
The Berlin Bowl in the Lustgarten is by no means a solitaire from that period.

- In the State Hermitage Museum in Saint Petersburg, an oval bowl made of Revnev jasper measuring 5.04 m × 3.22 m rests on a pedestal about two meters high. The production of the jasper bowl lasted from 1820 to 1843. The fact that this bowl was crafted from the largest piece of jasper in the world, a gemstone often used to create jewelry, makes it noteworthy. The bowl has a 12.55-meter (nearly 40-foot) circumference.
- The porphyry bowl from a piece in the Vatican Museum, which probably came from Nero's Golden House, is about one-third smaller than the Granitschale im Lustgarten, with a circumference of 44.5 feet (13.97 meters).
