= Altes Museum =

Antiquities museum in Berlin, Germany

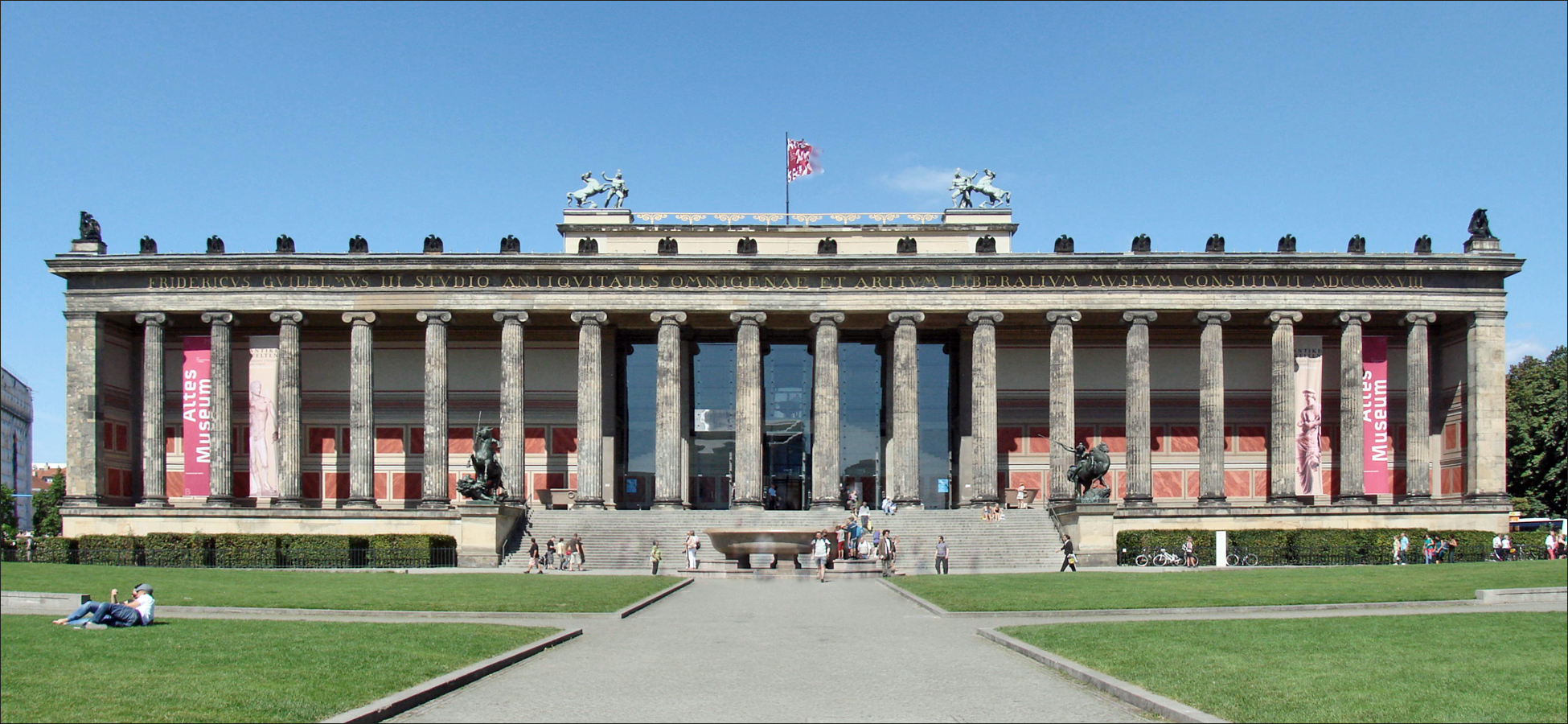
- View of the Altes Museum from the Lustgarten
- Interactive fullscreen map
- Location: Museum Island, Berlin
- Coordinates: 52°31′10″N 13°23′54″E
- Public transit access: U: Museumsinsel
- Website: Altes Museum

UNESCO World Heritage Site
- Part of: Museumsinsel (Museum Island), Berlin
- Criteria: Cultural: ii, iv
- Reference: 896
- Inscription: 1999 (23rd Session)
- Area: 8.6 ha (21 acres)
- Buffer zone: 22.5 ha (56 acres)

The Altes Museum (English: Old Museum) is a listed building on the Museum Island in the historic centre of Berlin, Germany. Built between 1825 and 1830 by order of King Frederick William III of Prussia according to plans by Karl Friedrich Schinkel, it is considered a major work of German Neoclassical architecture. It is surrounded by the Berlin Cathedral to the east, the Berlin Palace to the south and the Zeughaus to the west. Currently, the Altes Museum houses the Antikensammlung and parts of the Münzkabinett. As part of the Museum Island complex, the Altes Museum was listed as a UNESCO World Heritage Site in 1999, in recognition of its testimony to the development of the museum as a social and architectural phenomenon.

== History ==
=== Planning and location ===
In the early nineteenth century, Germany's bourgeoisie had become increasingly self-aware and self-confident. This growing class began to embrace new ideas regarding the relationship between itself and art, and the concepts that art should be open to the public and that citizens should be able to have access to a comprehensive cultural education began to pervade society. King Friedrich Wilhelm III of Prussia was a strong proponent of this Humboldtian ideal for education and charged Karl Friedrich Schinkel with planning a public museum for the royal art collection.

==== Schinkel's plans ====
Schinkel's plans for the Königliches Museum, as it was then known, were also influenced by drafts of the crown prince, the future King Friedrich Wilhelm IV, who desired a building that was heavily influenced by Classical antiquity. The crown prince even sent Schinkel a pencil sketch of a large hall adorned with a classical portico.

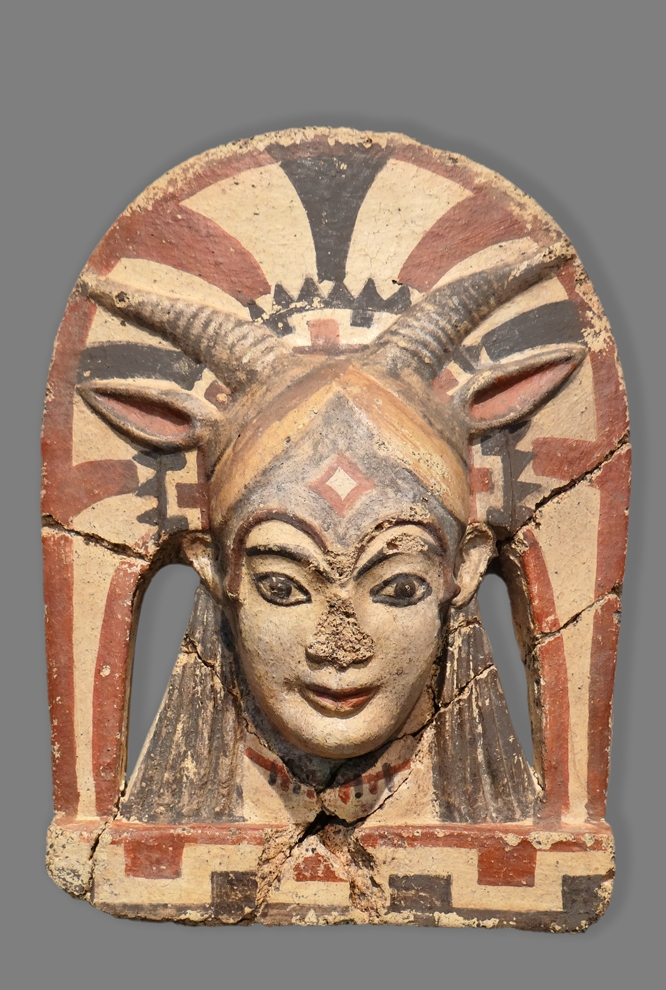
Etruscan antefix of Juno Sospita

Schinkel's plans incorporated the Königliches Museum into an ensemble of buildings, which surround the Berliner Lustgarten (pleasure garden). The Stadtschloss in the south was a symbol of worldly power, the Zeughaus in the west represented military might, and the Berliner Dom in the east was the embodiment of divine authority. The museum to the north of the garden, which was to provide for the education of the people, stood as a symbol for science and art—and not least for their torchbearer: the self-aware bourgeoisie. For the front facing the Lustgarten, a simple columned hall in grand style and proportionate to the importance of the location would most certainly give the building character. The arrangement of the eighteen Ionic columns was effected by the Lustgarten. The portico was designed with a function in order to give the museum building an exterior befitting its site, in which the monuments can be placed.

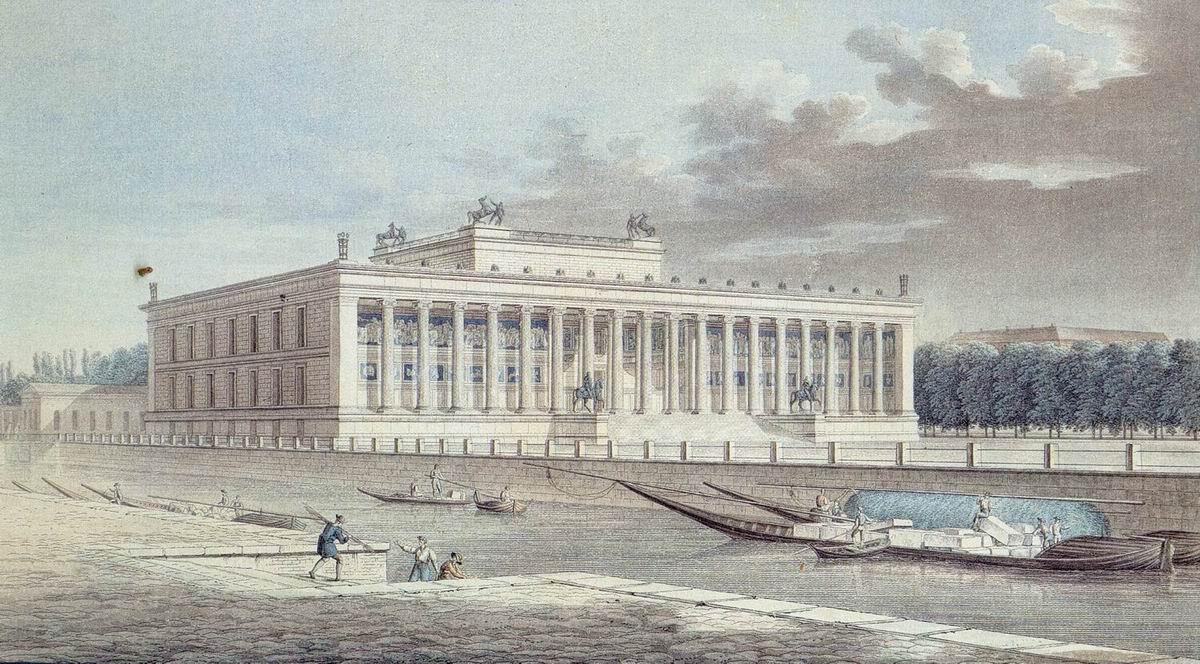
Altes Museum, c. 1830

Schinkel had developed plans for the Königliches Museum as early as 1822/23, but construction did not begin until 1825. Construction was completed in 1828 and the museum was inaugurated on 3 August 1830. Schinkel was also responsible for the renovation of the Berliner Dom, originally a Baroque cathedral, in the Neoclassical style, and he exercised considerable influence on Peter Joseph Lenné's renovation of the Lustgarten, which coincided with the construction of the museum, resulting in a harmonized and integrated ensemble.

==== Museum Island ====
In 1841, King Friedrich Wilhelm IV announced, in a royal decree, that the entire northern part of the Spree Island (now known as Museum Island) "be transformed into a sanctuary for art and science". In 1845, with the completion of the Neues Museum ("New"), the Königliches Museum was renamed the Altes Museum ("Old"), a name it holds to this day.

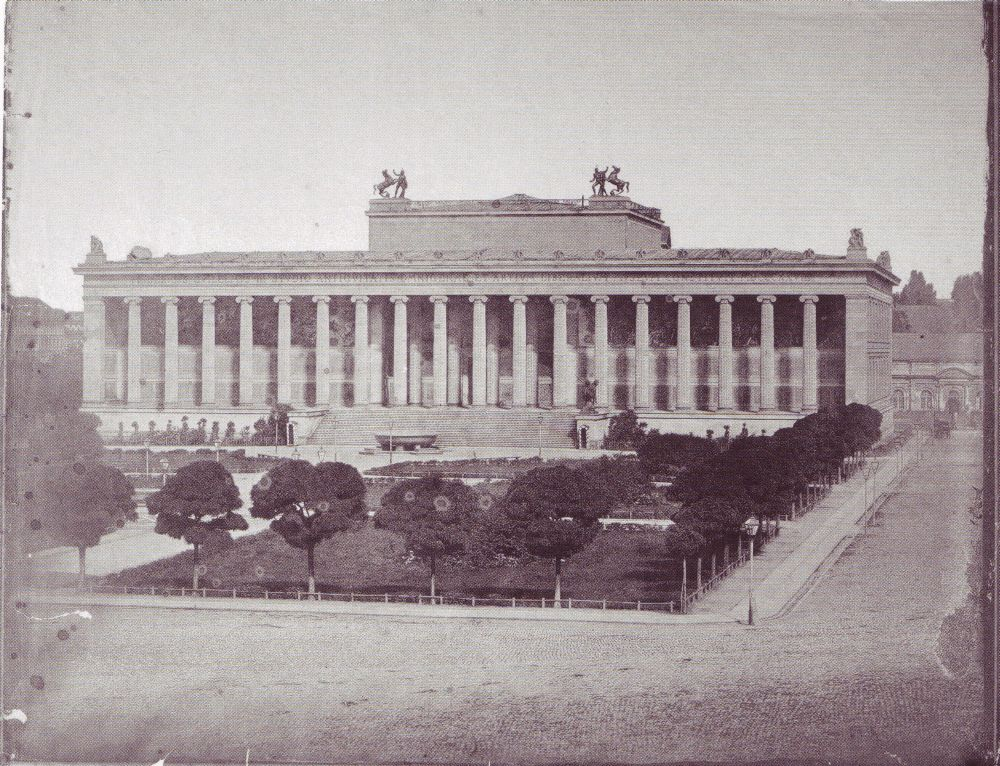
Historical photograph of the Altes Museum, before 1854

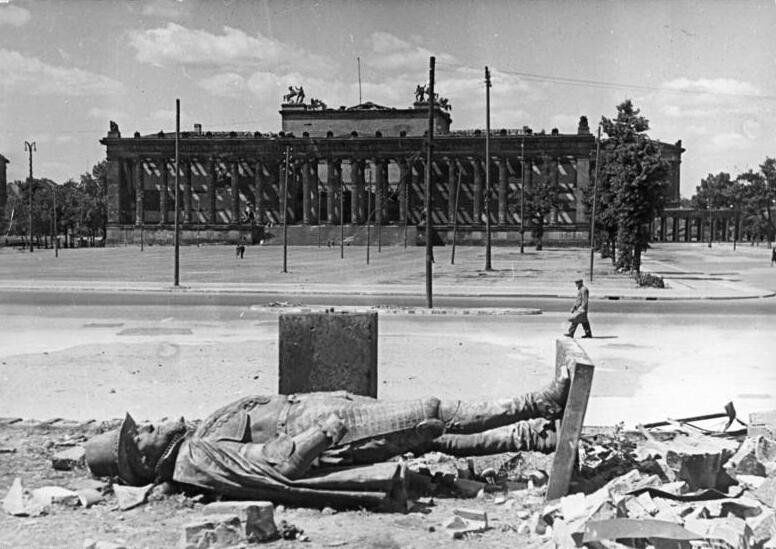
Altes Museum, 1950

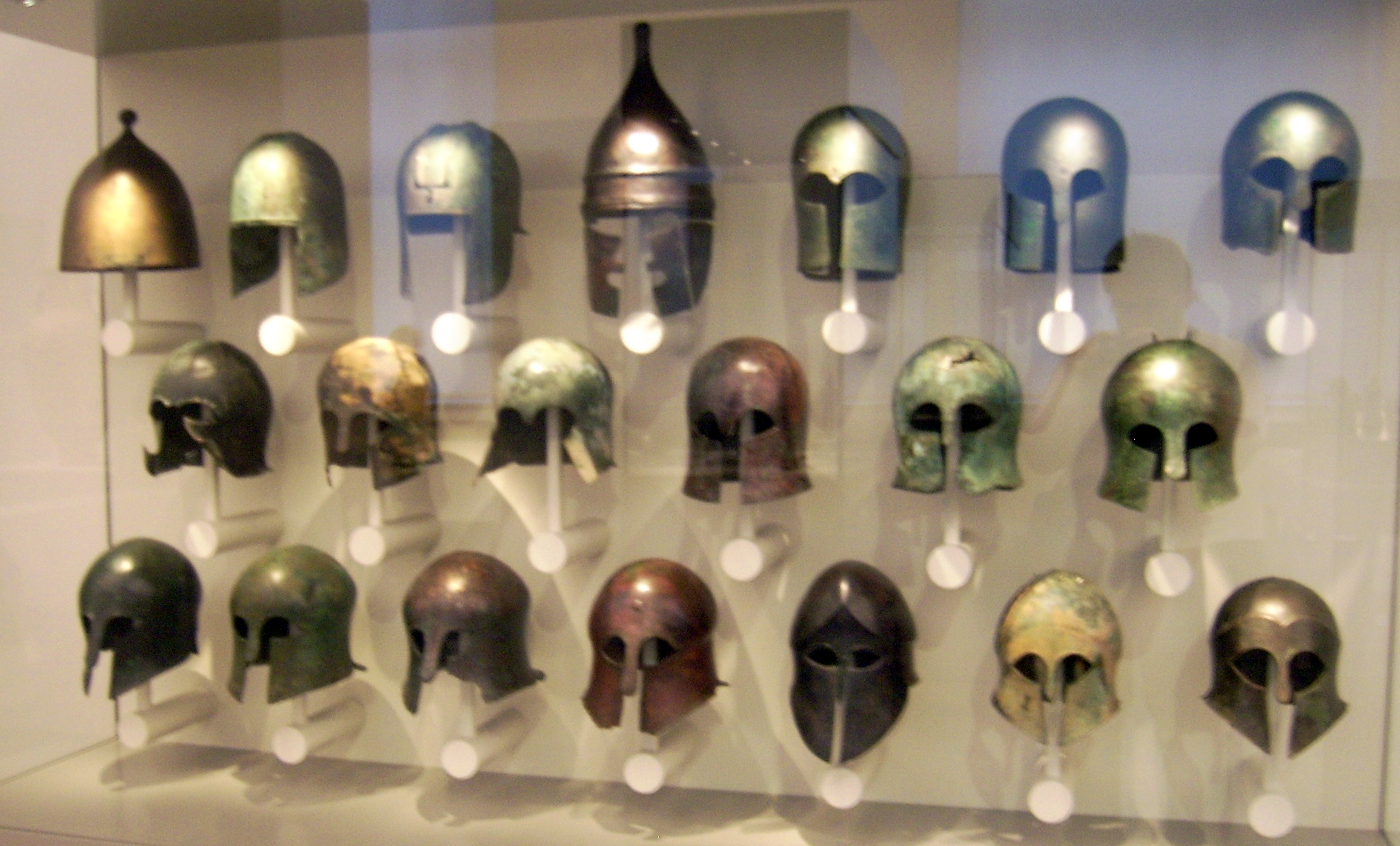
Types of Ancient Greek helmets, Antikensammlung Berlin

With the completion of the Neues Museum by Friedrich August Stüler in 1855, Museum Island began to take form. This was followed by the Nationalgalerie (now the Alte Nationalgalerie) by Johann Heinrich Strack (1876), the Kaiser-Friedrich-Museum (now the Bodemuseum) by Ernst von Ihne after plans by Stüler (1904), and the Pergamonmuseum by Alfred Messel and Ludwig Hoffmann (1930). Thus, Museum Island evolved into the institution it is today.

Julius Carl Raschdorff's 1894–1905 reconstruction of the Berliner Dom into a neo-Renaissance cathedral (replacing the classical cathedral designed by Schinkel) severely disrupted the classical ensemble, especially since the new cathedral has significantly larger dimensions than its predecessor.

==== Content of the museum ====
The royally appointed commission, which was responsible for the conception of the museum, decided to display only "High Art" in the proposed building, which included Old Master paintings and prints and drawings on the upper floor, as well as Classical sculpture from ancient Greece and Rome on the ground floor. This precluded the incorporation of ethnography, prehistory and the excavated treasures of the ancient Near East from Assyria, Persia, and elsewhere); instead, these artifacts were primarily housed in Schloss Monbijou.

=== 20th century ===
During the Nazi era, the Altes Museum was used as the backdrop for propaganda, both in the museum itself and upon the parade grounds of the redesigned Lustgarten. Close to the end of Second World War, the building was badly damaged when a tank truck exploded in front of it, and the frescoes designed by Schinkel and Peter Cornelius, which adorned the vestibule and the back wall of the portico, were largely lost.

Under General Director Ludwig Justi, the building was the first museum of Museum Island to undergo reconstruction and restoration, which was carried out from 1951 to 1966 by Hans Erich Bogatzky and Theodor Voissen. Following Schinkel's designs, the murals of the rotunda were restored in 1982. However, neither the ornate ceilings of the ground floor exhibition rooms nor the pairs of columns under the girders were reconstructed. The former connection to the Neues Museum has also not been rebuilt; instead, an underground passageway connecting all of the museums of Museum Island is planned as part of the Museumsinsel 2015 renovations.

== Gallery ==
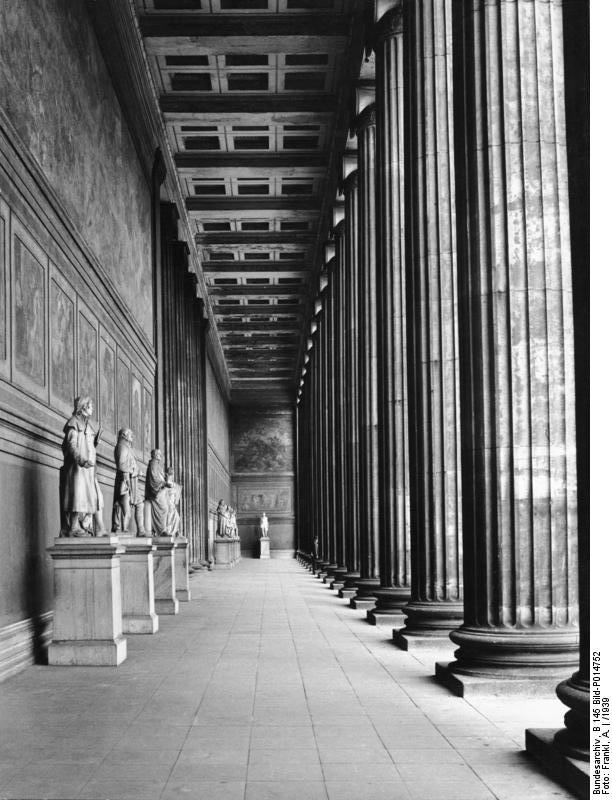
Vestibule with wall paintings by Peter von Cornelius, 1939

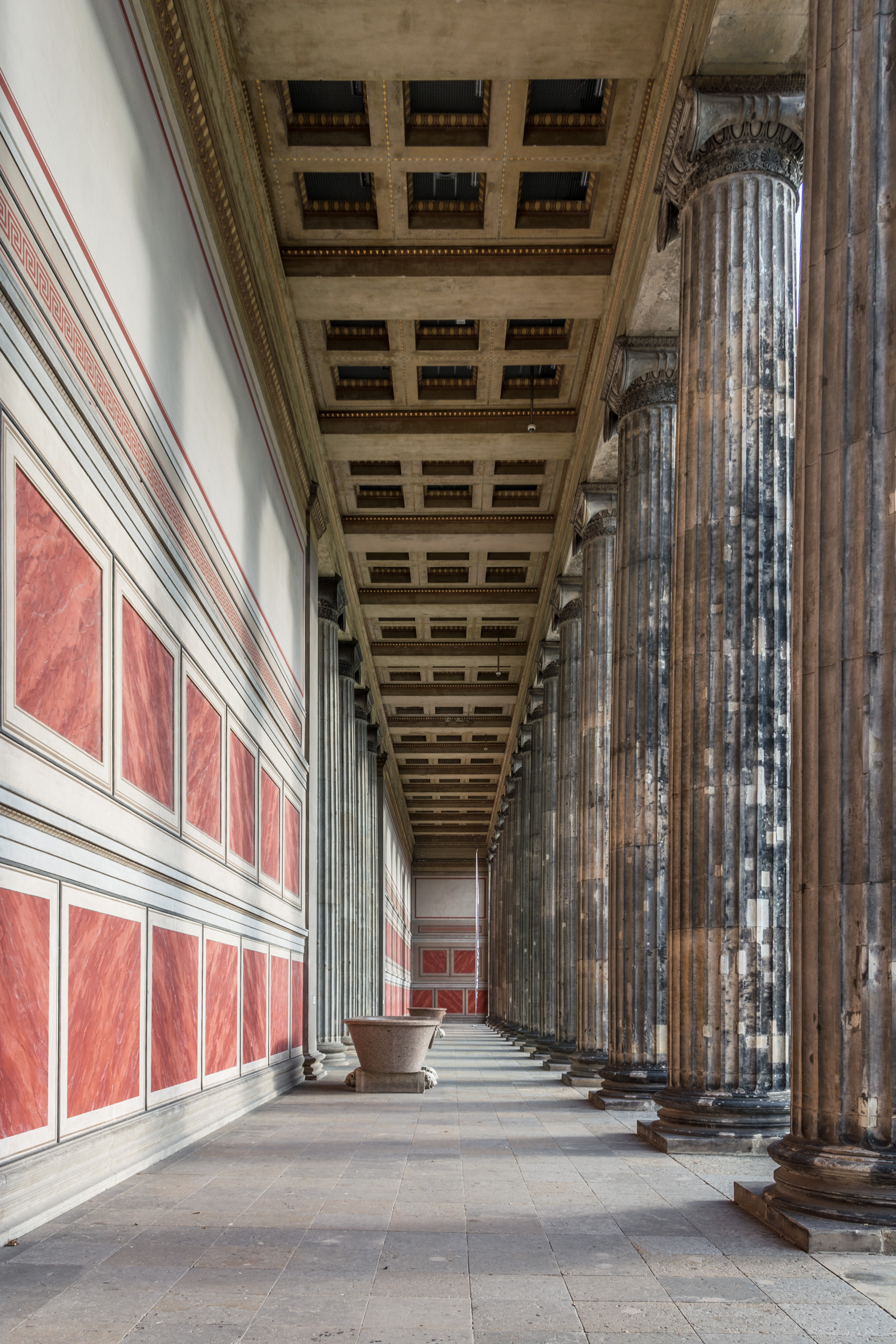
Vestibule without the wall paintings, 2017

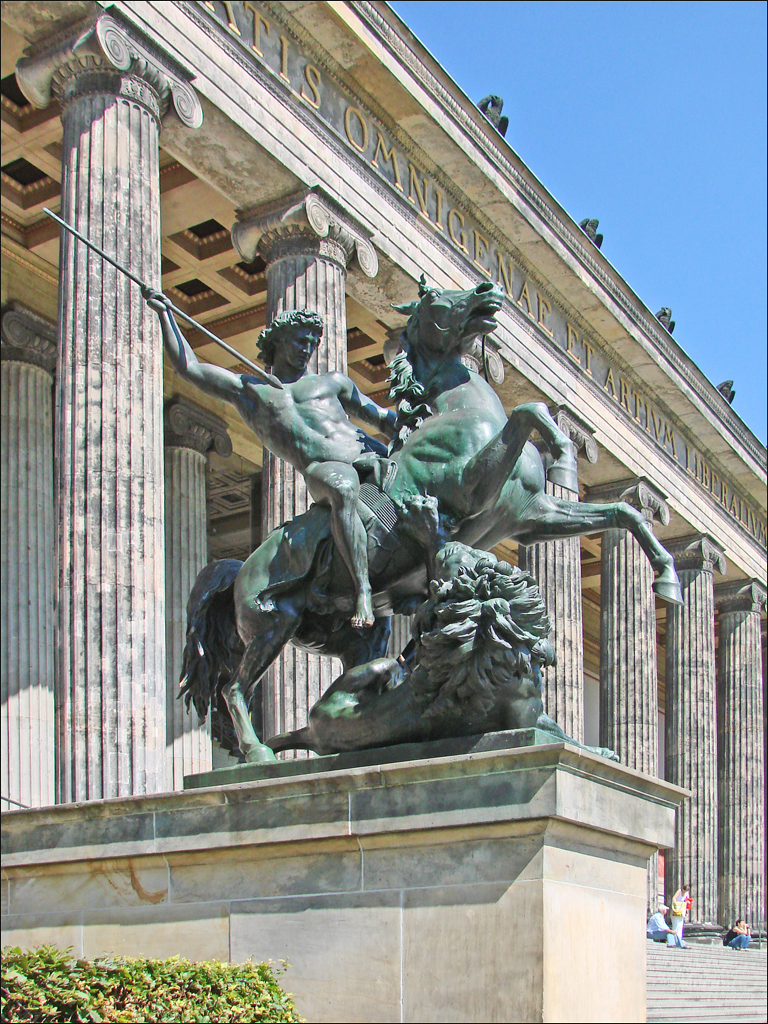
Löwenkämpfer in front of the museum building, 2011

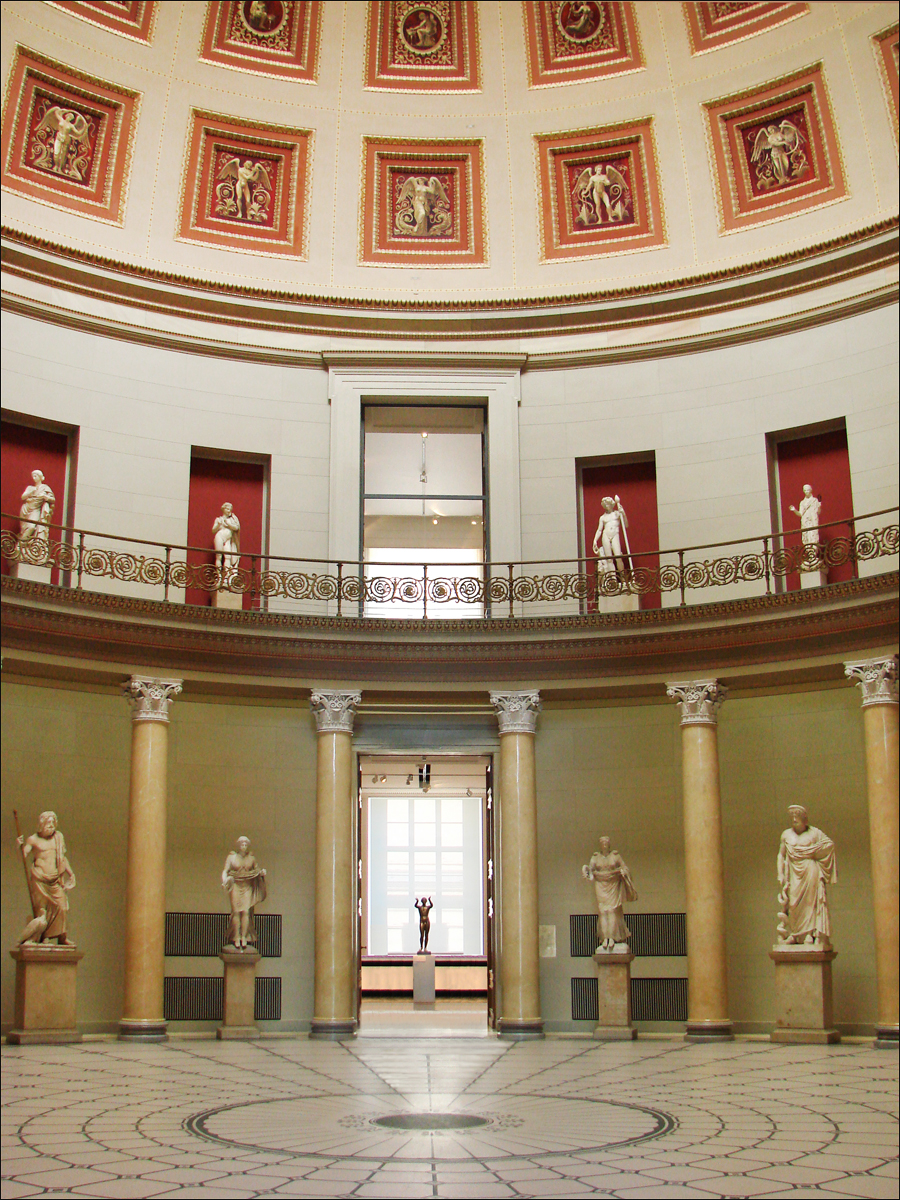
Rotunda, 2011

Centaur mosaic

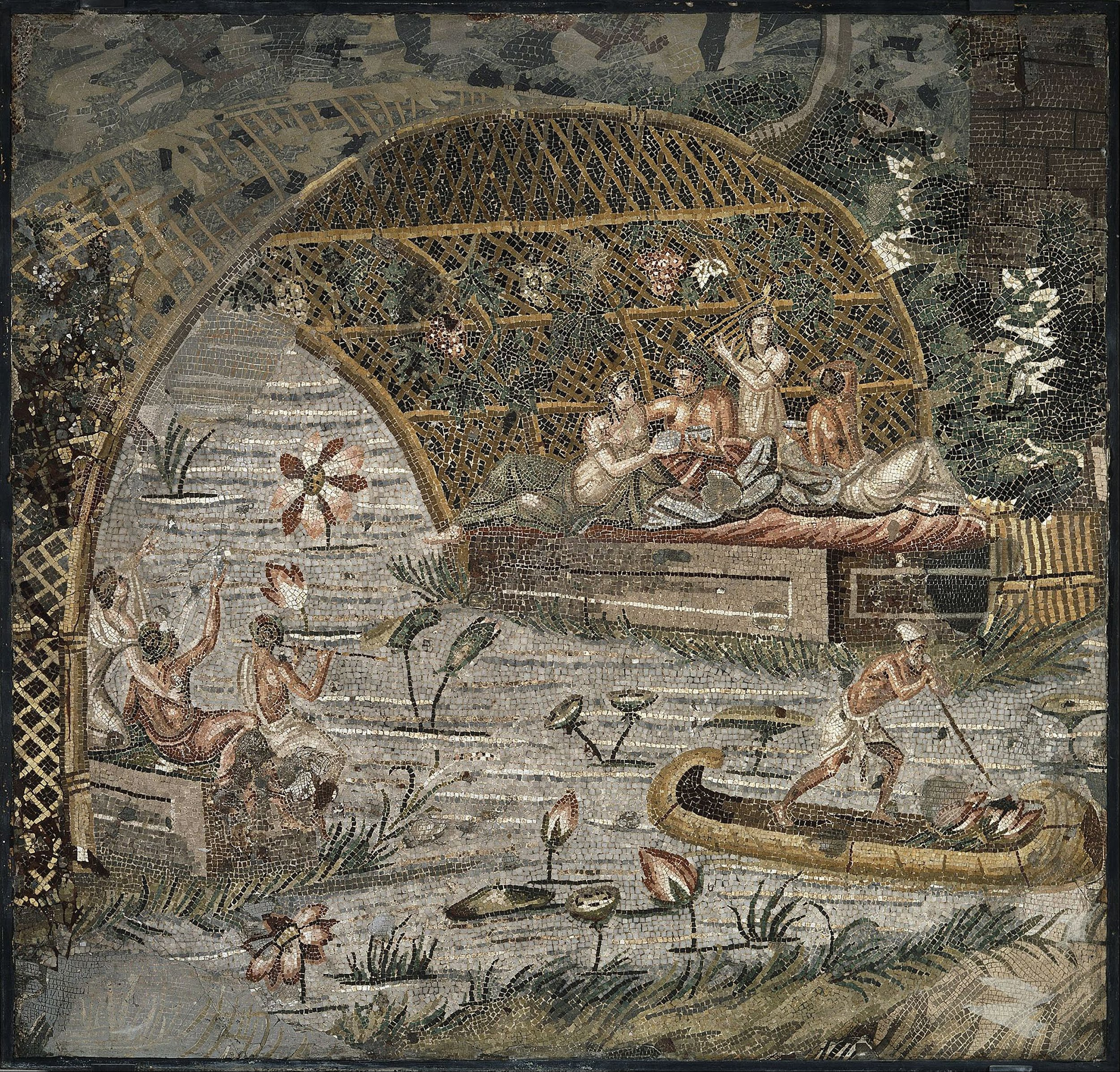
Nile mosaic

== The Antiquities Collection ==
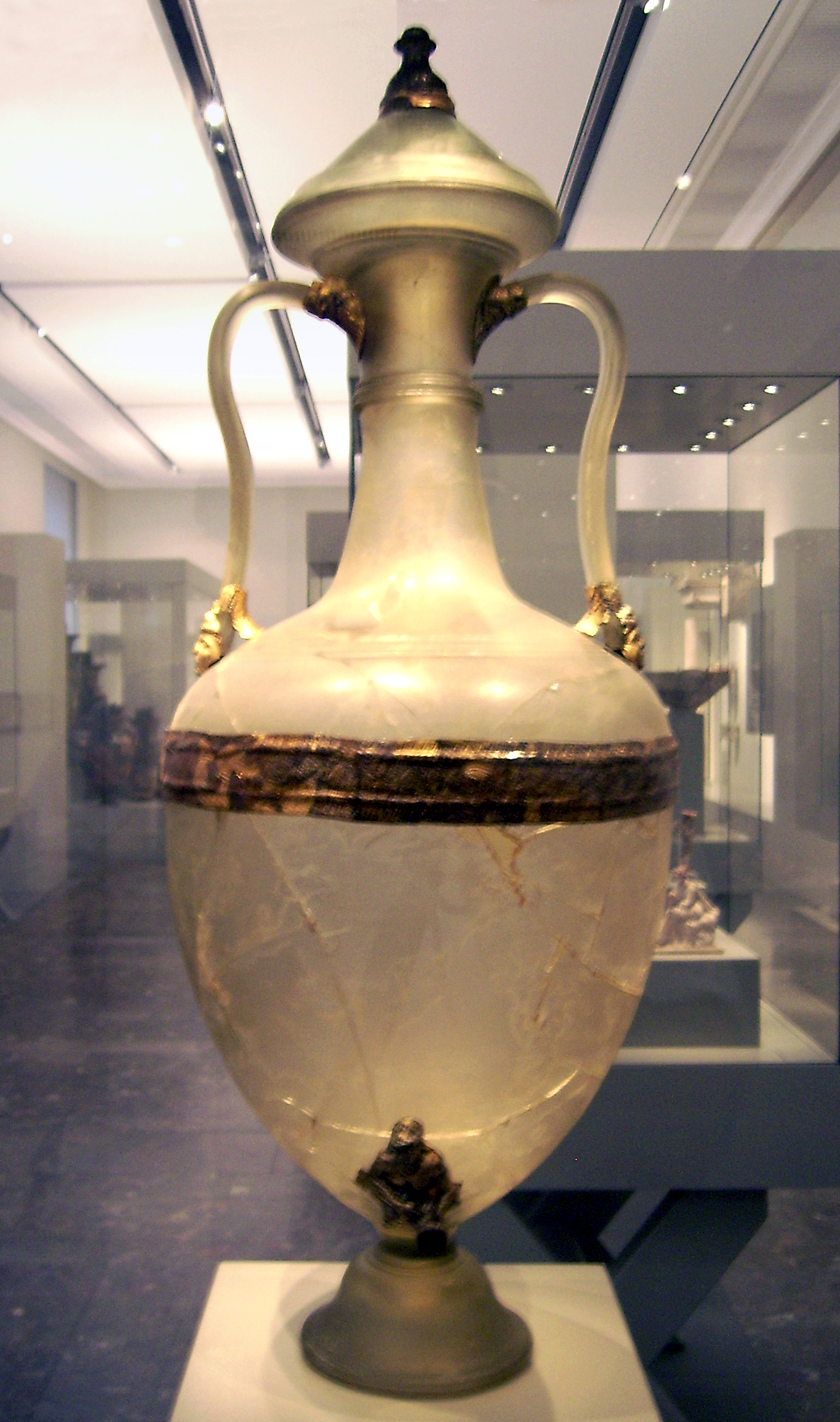
A Greek glass amphora, second half of the 2nd century BC, from Olbia, now in the Altes Museum

The Altes Museum was originally constructed to house all of the city's collections of fine arts, including Old Master paintings, and prints and drawings. However, since 1904, the museum has solely housed the Antikensammlung (Collection of Classical Antiquities). Since 1998, the Collection of Classical Antiquities has displayed its Greek collection, including the treasury, on the ground floor of the Altes Museum. Special exhibitions are displayed on the second floor of the museum.

== See also ==
- List of art museums
- List of museums in Berlin
- List of museums in Germany
- Granite bowl in Lustgarten
- Apulian picture vases for a funeral ceremony (Berlin Antique Collection)
