= Johann Erdmann Hummel =

German painter

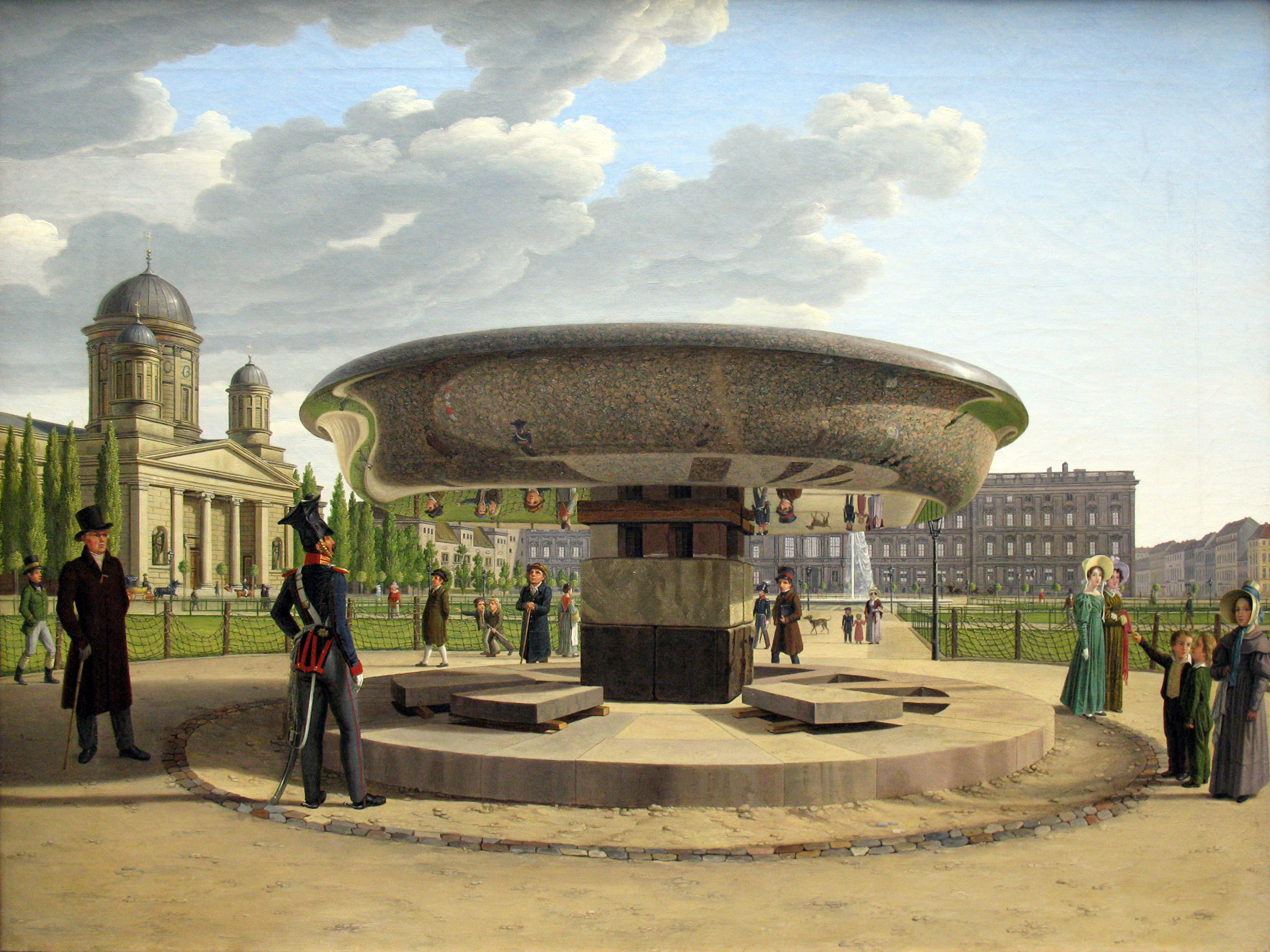
The Granite Dish in the Berlin Lustgarten (1831), oil on canvas, 66 x 89 cm. Alte Nationalgalerie, Berlin

Johann Erdmann Hummel (11 September 1769, Kassel — 26 October 1852, Berlin) was a German painter.

== Life ==
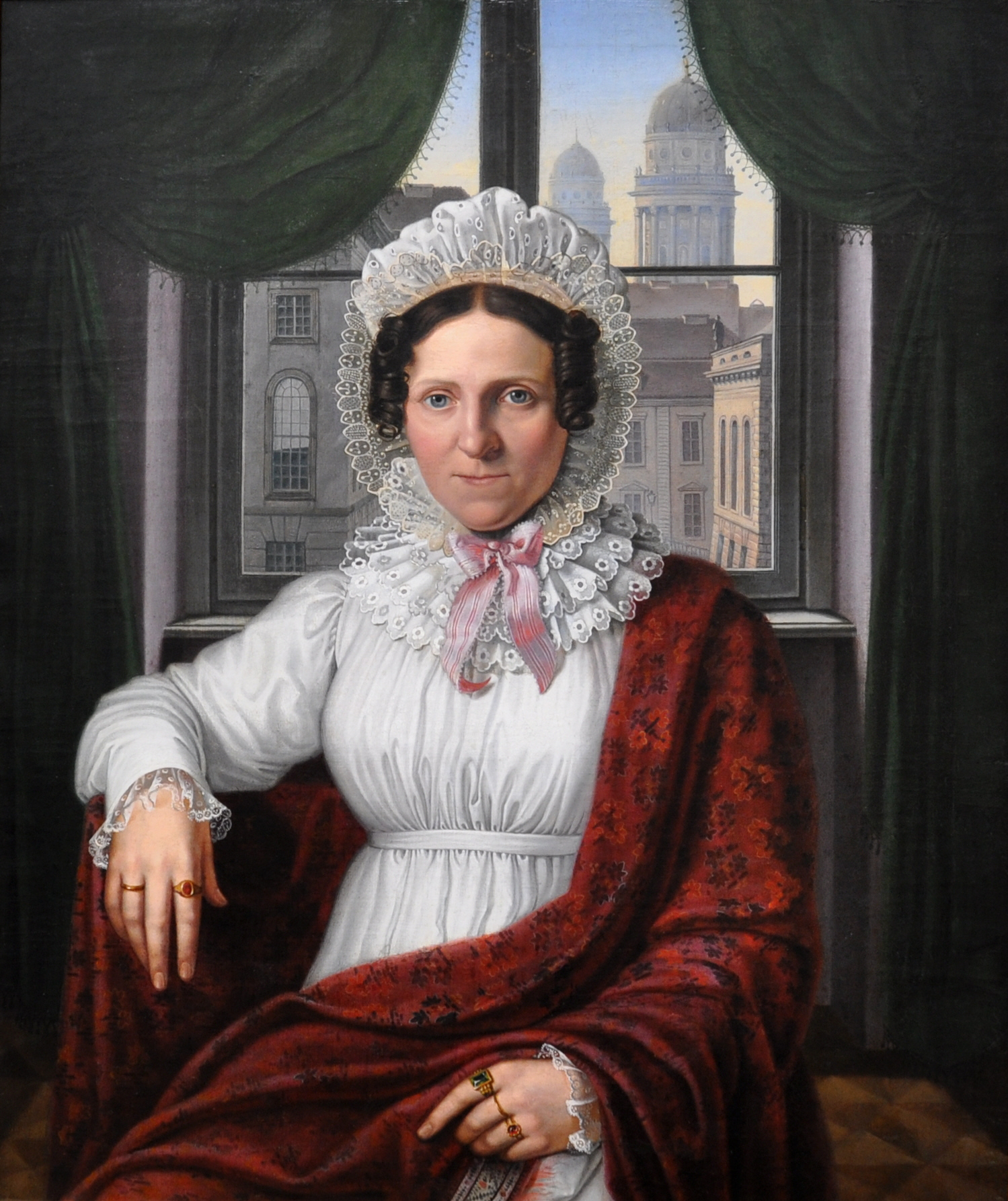
Johann Erdmann Hummel: Portrait of Mrs. Luise Mila

Hummel studied at the Kunsthochschule Kassel from 1780 to 1792. From 1792 to 1799 he lived in Rome, where he befriended various other German landscape painters who opposed the dominant classical style typified by the work of Anton Raphael Mengs. In his works from this period he primarily devoted himself to mythological themes. In 1799 he briefly returned to Kassel, and from there moved to Berlin, where he would remain for the rest of his life with the exception of a few short trips. He worked there as an illustrator, completing a series of engravings for a biography of Martin Luther and painting occasional portraits. In 1809 he became a professor at the Prussian Academy of Arts, teaching courses on perspective, optics, and architecture.

His work is characterized by a craftsman-like attention to detail and a scientific, emphasis on exact linear perspective.

== Gallery ==
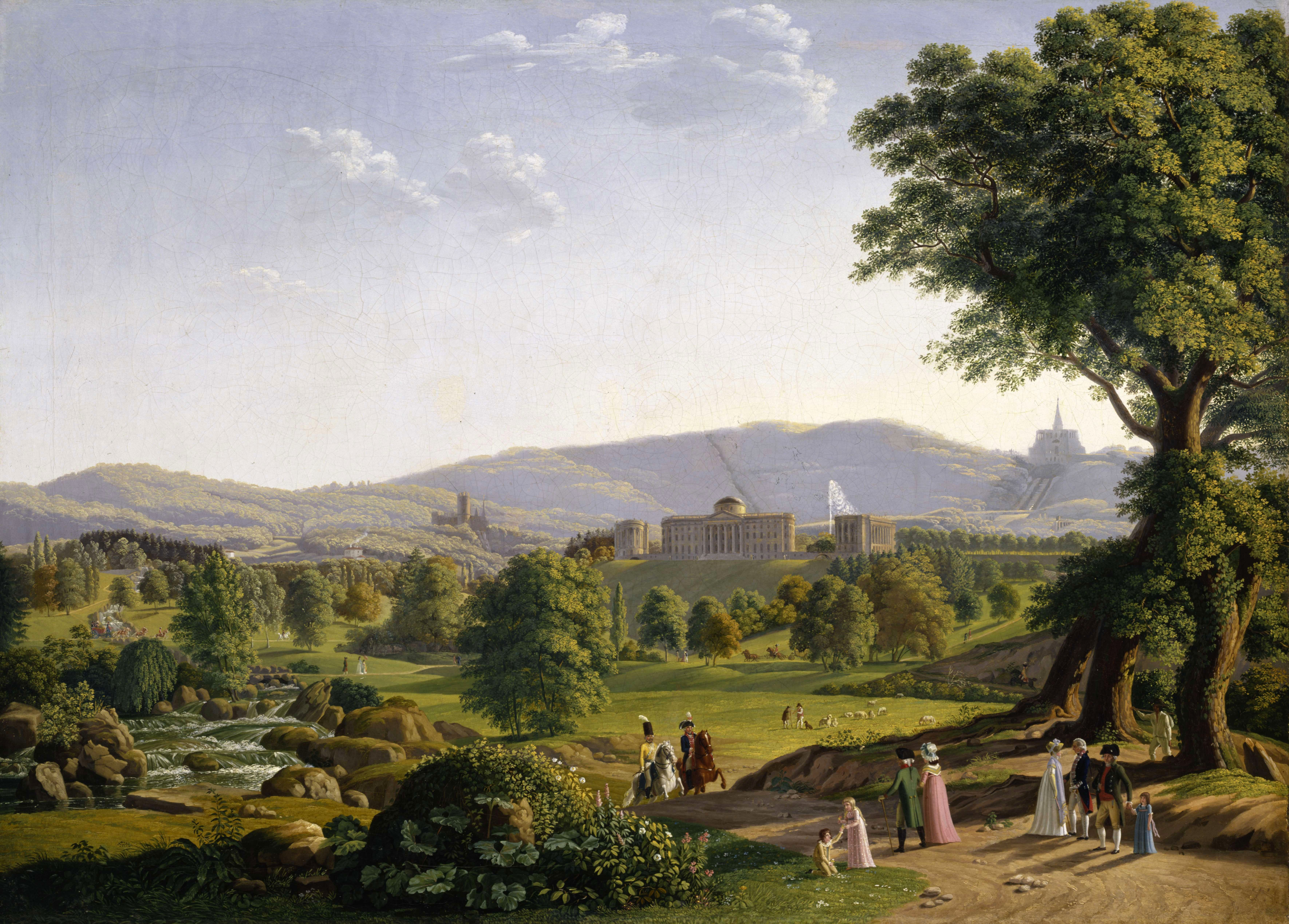
Wilhelmshöhe

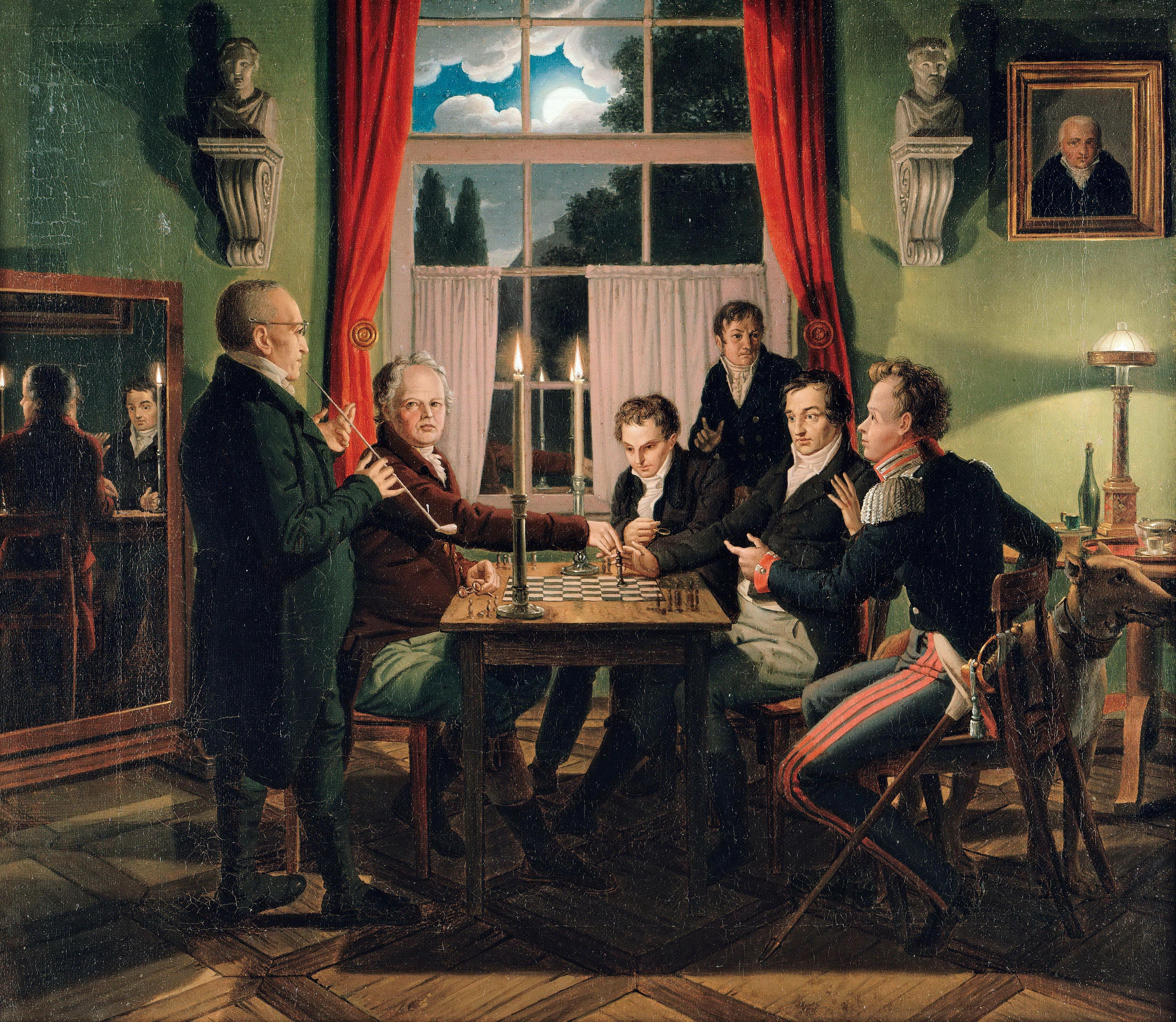
Chess game
