= Angler: The Cheney Vice Presidency =

2008 book by Washington Post investigative reporter Barton Gellman

- First edition cover
- Author: Barton Gellman
- Language: English
- Genre: Nonfiction
- Publisher: Penguin Press
- Publication date: September 2008
- Publication place: United States
- Media type: Hardback, audiobook
- Pages: 384 pages
- ISBN: 978-1-59420-186-8
- OCLC: 191929196
- Dewey Decimal: 973.931092 B 22
- LC Class: E840.8.C43 G45 2008

Angler: The Cheney Vice Presidency is a 2008 book by Washington Post investigative reporter Barton Gellman. Presenting information in a narrative fashion, Gellman asserts that United States Vice President Dick Cheney misled Republican leaders about the threat of Iraq before the invasion of Iraq by the United States. The book levels several allegations against Cheney and his administration. The book is based on hundreds of previously unpublished interviews with high-ranking government officials.

== Background ==
Barton Gellman, a staff writer for The Washington Post, participated in a lengthy series of Pulitzer Prize-winning stories about Vice President Cheney published in November 2007. Angler is the conclusion of that investigation, and arranges the findings in a narrative fashion.

Throughout the course of the interviews, Gellman spoke on record to Secretary of State Condoleezza Rice, National Security Advisor Stephen J. Hadley, White House Chief of Staff Joshua Bolten and his predecessor Andrew H. Card Jr., senior presidential advisers Dan Bartlett and Karl Rove, and numerous high-ranking Justice Department alumni, including John Ashcroft and James B. Comey. Cheney and President Bush declined Gellman's requests to be interviewed.

Of the title of the book, Gellman said in a television interview:

Cheney's Secret Service codename. They have a wry sense of humor about the way they give codenames, and a lot of times they have a double meaning. Obviously, Cheney is an avid fisherman. I thought it was a nice metaphor for the way that he works. He tends to approach the levers of power obliquely. He doesn't like to—like you to see him coming, doesn't like to have an overt public role. He finds his way to the place where decisions are made and often doesn't leave many signs of his presence.

== Contents ==
- Cheney designed a questionnaire for vice presidential candidates to fill in and sign, and insisted the candidates sign waivers allowing him complete access to their medical and psychiatric records, FBI files, financial files, and IRS returns. Included was a question regarding whether there was anything that could be used to blackmail the respondent. Cheney did not fill in his own questionnaire; according to Gellman, this is "contrary to what the campaign said at the time"

From news sources about the book, with quotes of the book itself:

- Cheney lobbied Richard Armey with information that had no basis in contemporary intelligence information. Armey's stand against giving George W. Bush authority to wage war in late 2002 had attracted congressional Democrats to support his opposition; Armey's opinion had become critical to the congressional vote required for war. The vice president's assertions were delivered to Armey alone in a highly classified briefing in Room H-208 in the Capitol Building, reports Gellman. They "crossed so far beyond the known universe of fact that they were simply without foundation." Armey said Cheney misled him by saying that Iraqi President Saddam Hussein had direct personal ties to al-Qaeda terrorists and was making rapid progress toward a suitcase nuclear weapon.
  Cheney said, according to Armey, that Iraq's "ability to miniaturize weapons of mass destruction, particularly nuclear," had been "substantially refined since the first Gulf War," and would soon result in "packages that could be moved even by ground personnel." Cheney linked that threat to Saddam's alleged personal ties to al Qaeda, Armey said, explaining that "we now know they have the ability to develop these weapons in a very portable fashion, and they have a delivery system in their relationship with organizations such as al Qaeda."

Armey said he reversed his position after Cheney told him that the threat from Iraq was actually "more imminent than we want to portray to the public at large."

- Confidential information provided by former Republican governor Frank Keating to Cheney to fill out Cheney's questionnaires was later leaked to Newsweek. Said Keating to Gellman; "Dick Cheney coming into my life has been like a black cloud".
- The heart surgeon who cleared Cheney for the vice presidency neither met Cheney nor reviewed his medical records.
- While George W. Bush was in a schoolroom reading The Pet Goat to children, Cheney ordered the Air Force to shoot down other potentially hijacked passenger planes after the World Trade Center and the Pentagon were attacked; it was later claimed that Bush had previously given an order to do so, and Cheney merely followed it. Gellman's book offers new evidence that that was not the case.
- Cheney instituted a warrantless surveillance program without notifying the FBI or the CIA.
  Hayden has this sort of famous, or famous in Washington, briefing device. He draws a Venn diagram with three overlapping ovals: one of them is what they would love to be able to do, one is what they're technically capable of doing, and one is what's legal. And what he says is, you know, "Where we work is right in the space where those three ovals intersect." And Cheney tells him, "Suppose that third oval wasn't there. Suppose you were not constrained by the law. And he is not saying, "Let's break the law." He's saying, "Let's suppose there were no legal restriction. Then what would you do?" And he does not go in the direction of asking for a change in the law. He presses the interpretation that, as commander-in-chief in wartime and because intelligence gathering is inherent in war, Bush doesn't have to follow the explicit prohibitions in two felony statutes on warrantless surveillance, that Bush, as commander-in-chief, can simply override those and override them secretly. - Barton Gellman
- Threats of mass resignation within the administration, including top Justice Department officials and the director of the FBI, in response to the "plans to unilaterally adopt a program of torture and domestic spying that the Justice Department, FBI, Office of Legal Counsel and the lawyers for all the intelligence agencies believed was illegal." - Los Angeles Times caused Bush to reverse the order he had signed a day earlier.

== Reception ==
Critical book reviews have been positive. Time magazine stated that "while Gellman's book feels more like a collection of set-pieces than a cohesive whole, this look at this second most powerful office in the land couldn't be timelier." The Christian Science Monitor calls the book a "meticulously researched, highly readable new biography" that "tells the story of a man who has left a powerful imprint on American government." The Los Angeles Times calls the book a "carefully reported and vigorously written" book that "creates immensely valuable clarity and perspective."
