= Barton Gellman =

American journalist and Sr Advisor, Brennan Center for Justice

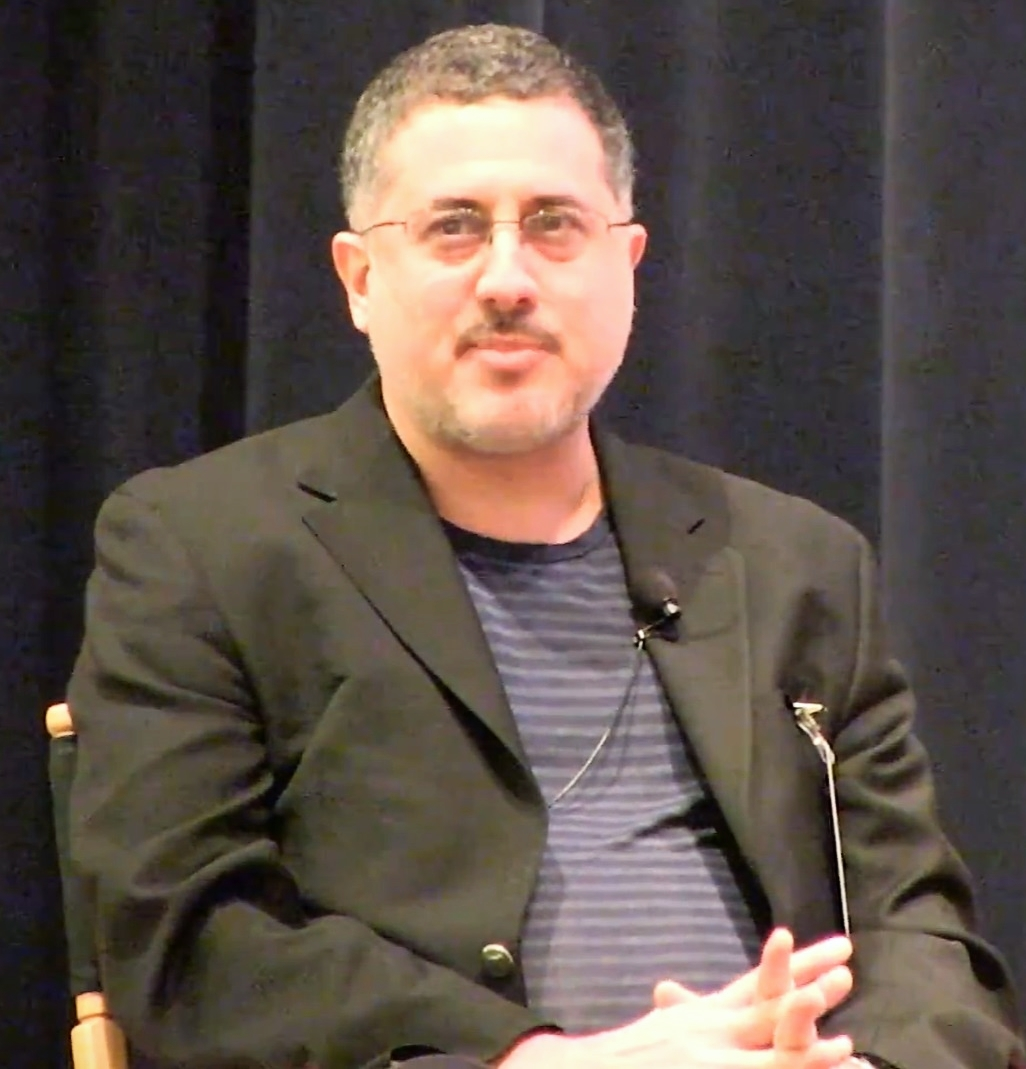
- Gellman in 2014
- Born: Barton David Gellman; 1960 (age 65–66); Philadelphia, Pennsylvania, U.S.
- Education: Princeton University; University College, Oxford
- Occupation: Journalist
- Employer: Brennan Center for Justice
- Title: Senior Advisor
- Partner: Dafna Linzer

Barton David Gellman (born 1960) is an American author and journalist known for his reports on the September 11 attacks, on Dick Cheney's vice presidency, and on the global surveillance disclosure. Beginning in June 2013, he authored The Washington Post's coverage of the U.S. National Security Agency, based on top secret documents provided to him by ex-NSA contractor Edward Snowden. He published a book for Penguin Press on the rise of the surveillance-industrial state in May 2020, and joined the staff of The Atlantic.

Gellman was formerly based at the Century Foundation, where he was a senior fellow, and held appointment as Visiting Lecturer and Author in Residence at Princeton University's Woodrow Wilson School of Public and International Affairs. From 2015 to 2017, Gellman was also a fellow at the Center for Information Technology Policy at Princeton.

As of January 22, 2024, Gellman stepped away from The Atlantic staff and became Senior Advisor at the Brennan Center for Justice at NYU Law School.

== Early life and education ==
Gellman was born in 1960. His father was Stuart Gellman and his mother Marcia Jacobs of Philadelphia. He is Jewish.

After graduating from George Washington High School in Philadelphia, he graduated summa cum laude from Woodrow Wilson School of Public and International Affairs at Princeton University. He earned a master's degree in politics from University College, Oxford as a Rhodes Scholar.

== Career ==
=== Newspaper and magazine writing ===
Gellman has said he found his way to his high school newspaper after washing out as a junior varsity gymnast. He began his tenure as editor with a legal battle. Carol Wacker, the principal at George Washington High School, directed him to kill a package of stories about teenage pregnancy. When he refused, Wacker seized and burned his first issue and fired him as editor. Gellman filed a First Amendment challenge in U.S. District Court against the principal and the School District of Philadelphia. He won a favorable settlement nearly a year after graduation, but the articles were never published. Gellman became chairman, or editor in chief, of The Daily Princetonian in his junior year of college, and worked as a summer intern at The New Republic, National Journal, The Miami Herald and The Washington Post.

The Washington Post editor Ben Bradlee hired Gellman as a full-time staff writer in 1988 to cover Washington, D.C. courts, including the trial of former D.C. mayor Marion Barry. Gellman went on to become Pentagon correspondent during the 1991 Persian Gulf War, the U.S. intervention in Somalia and the social upheavals relating to the status of homosexuals in the military and the assignment of women to combat roles. In 1994, he moved to Jerusalem as bureau chief, covering peace negotiations, the assassination of Yitzhak Rabin, and the ascent of Benjamin Netanyahu. He returned to Washington as diplomatic correspondent in late 1997, covering Secretary of State Madeleine Albright and the collapse of the United Nations Special Commission (UNSCOM) effort to disarm Iraq.

Gellman moved to New York in 1999 to take up a role as special projects reporter, focusing on long-term investigative stories. Among his early projects in the new role was a series on the early life of Senator Bill Bradley, with partner Dale Russakoff, during Bradley's run for the 2000 Democratic Party presidential primaries.

In 2000, he led a team of reporters in an award-winning series on the rise of the global AIDS pandemic and the failure of governments, pharmaceutical companies and the World Health Organization to act on clear warnings that the disease was on a path to killing tens of millions of people.

On the morning of Sept. 11, 2001, Gellman wrote an eyewitness account from the scene of the World Trade Center. He spent the next two years tracking the war with Al Qaeda. Gellman broke stories on the history of the "Global War on Terror" before 9/11 under Presidents Bill Clinton and George W. Bush; the activation of a secret "shadow government" and the escape of Osama bin Laden from Tora Bora. In late 2002, he and fellow reporter Dana Priest disclosed that the U.S. government was holding terrorism suspects in secret prisons overseas and subjecting them to abusive interrogation techniques.

Gellman broke important stories about the use of and misuse of intelligence Iraqi weapons of mass destruction before and after the war in Iraq, including an account of the previously undisclosed White House Iraq Group. In Iraq, traveling with weapons hunters with the Iraq Survey Group, he showed vividly how the search for WMD was failing, even as the Bush administration asserted otherwise. When Gellman reported that U.S. and allied teams had exhausted their leads on a "reconstituted" Iraqi nuclear weapons program, the CIA issued a strong rebuttal. In testimony before the U.S. Senate, less than 3 months later, Iraq Study Group head David Kay acknowledged that The Post's account had been correct. By January 2004, Gellman used independent interviews on the ground with Iraqi scientists and engineers, U.S. and United Nations officials to tell a comprehensive story about how the prewar allegations fell apart. During the presidential election campaign of 2004, Gellman and partner Dafna Linzer wrote a series on the Bush administration's national security record, offering behind-the-scenes narratives of the war with al Qaeda and of Bush's efforts to stop the spread of nuclear weapons.

In 2005, Gellman discovered that the Defense Department, under Secretary Donald Rumsfeld, was building Strategic Support Branch, a clandestine human intelligence service to rival the CIA, and that the commander had a controversial past. Later that year he uncovered classified details about the FBI's abuse of National Security Letters under the new powers granted by the USA Patriot Act, revealing as well that the bureau issued tens of thousands of those letters every year. The Justice Department mounted a fierce campaign to discredit that story, but eventually was obliged to retract many of its accusations. Congress responded to the story by asking the Justice Department Inspector General to investigate the use of NSLs. The Inspector General's blistering report, nearly two years later, led to substantial reforms.

In 2007, Gellman and Jo Becker wrote a four-part series on Vice President Dick Cheney, persuading many of his allies and opponents to speak on the record for the first time. The widely honored series pierced the secrecy protecting the most powerful Number Two in White House history, demonstrating Cheney's dominance of the "iron issues" of national security, economic and legal policy. Gellman took an extended book leave in 2008 to expand the newspaper series into a book for Penguin Press called "Angler: The Cheney Vice Presidency."

After 21 years on the staff of The Washington Post, Gellman resigned in February 2010 to concentrate full-time on book and magazine writing.

Between 2010 and 2013, Gellman was contributing editor at large of Time magazine, where his work included cover stories on extremist domestic militias, on FBI Director Robert Mueller, and on the early influences in the life of Republican Party Presidential Nominee Mitt Romney. He also wrote Time's CounterSpy blog on digital privacy and security.

=== Global surveillance disclosure ===
Gellman returned to The Washington Post on temporary contract in May 2013 to lead the paper's coverage of the 2013 and 2014 Global surveillance disclosure, based on top-secret documents leaked by ex-NSA contractor Edward Snowden. In December 2013, after interviewing Snowden in Moscow, Gellman summarized 6 months of reporting in The Post as follows:

Taken together, the revelations have brought to light a global surveillance system that cast off many of its historical restraints after the attacks of Sept. 11, 2001. Secret legal authorities empowered the NSA to sweep in the telephone, Internet and location records of whole populations.

— The Washington Post

Gellman has spoken about the revelations in numerous broadcasts and public appearances. Among the most widely cited is an interview on NPR's Fresh Air with host Terry Gross. He spoke of the biblical roots of surveillance in a lecture at St. John's Church (the "church of the presidents") and participated in panel discussions at Princeton, Yale and Harvard. Gellman has twice debated former NSA and CIA Director Michael Hayden about the Snowden revelations, first at Duke University and then at American University. "The government tries to keep secrets and we try to find them out," Gellman said in the second debate. "There are tradeoffs."

In February 2014, Gellman stated during an event at Georgetown University that due to legal concerns the full story about his contact with Snowden had not yet been revealed. "I don't rule out that there is legal exposure either criminally in an unlikely case or rather more likely civil compulsion," Gellman said. "Just because Edward Snowden has outted himself doesn't mean every part of my interaction or my reporting around these documents has been disclosed or I'd be willing to disclose any more of it."

== 2020 Election Interference ==
On September 23, 2020, Gellman published "The Election that Could Break America" in The Atlantic. Gellman predicted Donald Trump's plan to thwart certification of the election.

== Author ==
Gellman is author of Contending with Kennan: Toward a Philosophy of American Power, a well-received 1985 study of the post-World War II "containment" doctrine and its architect George F. Kennan.

In 2008, Penguin Press published Gellman's bestselling Angler: The Cheney Vice Presidency. Gellman helped adapt the book for a screenplay, initially optioned for an HBO miniseries. Screenwriter Debora Cahn reworked the story as a feature film, and her script was voted among the top five unproduced movies of 2013 in Hollywood's annual "Black List." It has since been optioned by independent producer Harvey Weinstein.

In 2020, Penguin Press published Gellman's Dark Mirror: Edward Snowden and the American Surveillance State.

=== Honors and awards ===
Gellman has contributed to three Pulitzer Prizes for The Washington Post, winning as an individual, team member and team leader. In 2002, he was part of the team that won the Pulitzer Prize for National Reporting on the September 11 attacks. He and Becker won the same award in 2008 for "a lucid exploration of Vice President Dick Cheney and his powerful yet sometimes disguised influence on national policy. The Washington Post and The Guardian shared the 2014 Pulitzer Prize for Public Service; Gellman anchored the team for the Post, cited "for its revelation of widespread secret surveillance by the National Security Agency, marked by authoritative and insightful reports that helped the public understand how the disclosures fit into the larger framework of national security."

Previously, Gellman was a jury-nominated Pulitzer finalist in 1999 and 2004. Other professional honors include two Emmy Awards as editorial consultant to the PBS Frontline film USA of Secrets, Harvard's Goldsmith Prize for Investigative Reporting, two Overseas Press Club awards, two George Polk Awards, the Sigma Delta Chi Award from the Society of Professional Journalists, the Gerald Ford Foundation Prize for reporting on national defense, the SAIS-Novartis International Journalism Award and the Jesse Laventhol Award for deadline writing from the American Society of Newspaper Editors.

Angler, Gellman's book on Dick Cheney, won the Los Angeles Times Book Prize and was named among the 100 Notable Books of 2008 by The New York Times.

In 2014, Gellman shared the Gerald Loeb Award for Large Newspapers for five stories on the NSA.

== Teaching ==
Gellman returned to Princeton for two semesters as Ferris Professor of Journalism in 2002 and 2009, teaching courses called "The Literature of Fact" and "Investigative Reporting".

In 2003 and 2004, Gellman organized a lecture series on national security secrecy at Princeton's Woodrow Wilson School. He delivered two of the lectures himself, making arguments that prefigured the debate about the disclosure of secrets obtained ten years later from Edward Snowden.

Since 2011, Gellman has twice taught a course called "Secrecy, Accountability and the National Security State".

== Personal life ==
Gellman lives with partner Dafna Linzer in New York City. A previous marriage to Tracy Ellen Sivitz ended in divorce in 2007. He is the father of four children: Abigail, Micah, Lily, and Benjamin Gellman.

== Books ==
- Contending with Kennan: Toward a Philosophy of American Power. New York: Praeger Publishers, 1985. ISBN 0-275-91737-1 (10). ISBN 978-0-275-91737-1 (13). [Hardcover ed.] New York: Greenwood Publishing Group, 1985. ISBN 0-275-91805-X (10). ISBN 978-0-275-91805-7 (13). [Paperback ed.]
- Angler: The Cheney Vice Presidency. New York: Penguin Press, 2008. ISBN 1-59420-186-2 (10). ISBN 978-1-59420-186-8 (13). [Hardcover ed.]
- Dark Mirror: Edward Snowden and the American Surveillance State. New York: Penguin Press, 2020. ISBN 1-59420-601-5 (10). ISBN 978-1-59420-601-6 (13). [Hardcover ed.]
  - German: Der dunkle Spiegel. Edward Snowden und die globale Überwachungsindustrie. S. Fischer Verlag, Frankfurt 2020, ISBN 978-3-10-397046-3
