= Dafna Linzer =

Canadian-American journalist

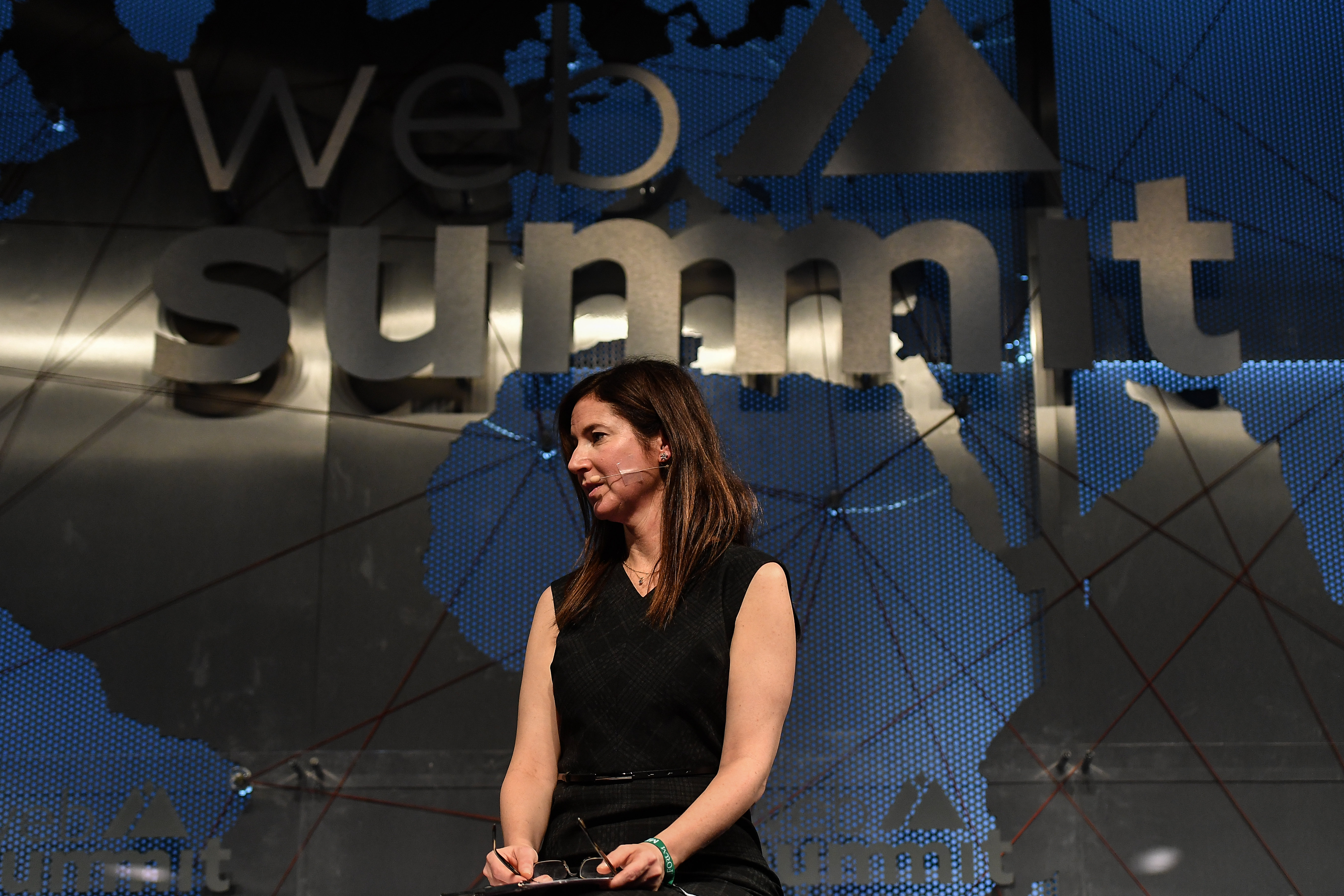
- Born: October 21, 1970 (age 55); Canada
- Partner: Barton Gellman

Dafna Linzer (born October 21, 1970) is a Canadian-American journalist who was the executive editor of Politico between 2022 and 2023. Since October 2015, she had been managing editor of politics for NBC News and MSNBC, with a role spanning broadcast and digital coverage on both networks for the 2016 election campaign. Linzer was formerly managing editor of MSNBC; senior reporter at ProPublica; foreign correspondent for the Associated Press; and national security reporter for The Washington Post.

== Early life ==
Linzer was born in 1970 and raised in Canada. She is of Jewish descent.

== Career ==
Linzer was a foreign correspondent for the Associated Press, based in Jerusalem. She then became a national security reporter for The Washington Post, where she covered intelligence and nonproliferation, and reported on the futile search for weapons of mass destruction in Iraq.

In February 2008, the non-profit journalism organization ProPublica announced that Linzer (along with Jeff Gerth) would be joining the project as senior reporters. At ProPublica, Linzer wrote the "Shades of Mercy" series on racial bias in presidential pardons. The series was a finalist for the Harvard Shorenstein Center's Goldsmith Prize for Investigative Reporting. Linzer also conducted work on the Guantanamo Bay detention camp under the Obama presidency, which won a 2010 Overseas Press Club Award and an honorable mention for the Silver Gavel Awards of the American Bar Association.

In 2013, Linzer joined MSNBC as managing editor of MSNBC digital. In October 2015, Linzer was named to the newly created position of managing editor of politics for NBC News and MSNBC, dividing her time between Washington and New York. In this post, Linzer oversees the political desk and reports to NBC News president Deborah Turness and MSNBC president Phil Griffin.

In March 2019, Linzer was criticized in a Twitter thread by journalist Yashar Ali for what he called "inappropriate and unethical" conduct. Ali claimed that Linzer had bullied him on behalf of the Democratic National Committee to delay a story for publication. He wrote, "I realized that @DafnaLinzer, the head of all political coverage for NBC News and MSNBC wasn't calling to advocate for her network, she was calling to advocate the DNC's position. She wanted me to wait so they could call state party leaders".

== Personal life ==
Linzer lives in New York City with her partner, writer and journalist Barton Gellman, and their four children.

She became a naturalized U.S. citizen in January 2011. Linzer has noted a number of accepted answers to the U.S. citizenship test are erroneous or incomplete.
