= Edward H. Harte =

Edward Holmead Harte (December 5, 1922 – May 18, 2011) was an American newspaper executive, journalist, philanthropist, and conservationist. The son of Houston Harte, co-founder of the Harte-Hanks newspaper conglomerate, he had a decades-long relationship with that organization. For Harte-Hanks, he was an executive and journalist with various newspapers, including The Snyder Daily News, The San Angelo Standard-Times, and The Corpus Christi Caller-Times. He also served as vice chairman of Harte-Hanks from 1962 to 1987. As a philanthropist, he donated tens of millions of dollars to a variety of charities and institutions. He was also a pioneer in environmental conservationism in Texas, notably spearheading successful land conservation campaigns on Padre Island and Mustang Island. In 2002, the National Audubon Society awarded him the Audubon Medal.

== Early life and education ==
Born in Pilot Grove, Missouri, Edward H. Harte came from a newspaper family. His great grandfather was a Washington correspondent for the New York Tribune and his father, Houston Harte, co-founded the Harte-Hanks newspaper conglomerate. He grew up in Depression-era San Angelo, Texas, where his father was publisher of The San Angelo Standard-Times.

During World War II, Harte served in the United States Army. After the war, he entered Dartmouth College, from which he earned a bachelor's degree. After graduating, he became a reporter for The Claremont Eagle in New Hampshire. He left that position to become a reporter for The Kansas City Star. He then partnered with his brother, Houston H. Harte, and Bernard Hanks’s son-in-law, Stormy Shelton, in buying the weekly Snyder, Texas, newspaper The Snyder Daily News. That publication became part of the Harte-Hanks newspaper chain.

== Work for Harte-Hanks ==
Harte worked for the Harte-Hanks corporation in a variety of capacities throughout his career. As a teenager, he had his first job working as a switchboard operator at The San Angelo Standard-Times, one of the many newspapers owned by the Harte-Hanks corporation. He later served as president of The San Angelo Standard-Times from 1952 to 1956. From 1962 until his retirement in 1987, he was vice chairman of Harte-Hanks and publisher of The Corpus Christi Caller-Times. In addition to serving as The Caller-Times' publisher, he also wrote a longstanding Sunday column for the paper that covered Mexican politics and current events. His column was known for providing coverage in this area that was not available elsewhere in the mainstream press. He continued to write that column even after his retirement as publisher in 1987.

== Conservationist and philanthropist ==
While running The Caller-Times, Harte further developed a passion for nature, which ultimately led to his becoming an activist for environmental conservation. He regularly visited the Aransas National Wildlife Refuge, where he met and befriended several members of the board of the National Audubon Society (NAS). In 1964, he joined the NAS board himself on which he served for 13 years. He was notably president of the NAS board from 1974 to 1979. Under his leadership, The Caller-Times became an important advocate for land preservation and environmental protection in what The New York Times described as "an unusual stance for a Texas newspaper at the time". In 1962, Harte successfully spearheaded a campaign to designate 67 miles (108 km) of Padre Island as a national seashore, a feat which resulted in the protection of the longest stretch of undeveloped barrier island in the world. In the early 1970s, he led another successful campaign to designate 3,954 acres of Mustang Island as a state park. In 1985, his brother and he donated their 66,000-acre ranch bordering the Big Bend National Park to The Nature Conservancy, which in turn donated the land to the Big Bend National Park in 1989.

In addition to his work as a conservationist, Harte was also a philanthropist. He donated a known $70 million to local Corpus Christi organizations and institutions such as universities, colleges, research labs, and environmental groups. His philanthropy likely extended considerably beyond this amount, as he often gave anonymous donations to charities and organizations for decades. Some of contributions included a $3.5 million donation towards a new performing arts center at Texas A&M University–Corpus Christi (TAMU-CC), $1.8 million for a library in Flour Bluff, and a $1 million challenge grant to Corpus Christi Metro Ministries, which helped save two homeless shelters from closing. In 2000, he established the Harte Research Institute for Gulf of Mexico Studies at TAMU–CC, with a $46 million endowment. The Institute has since played a major role in helping cleanup of the Deepwater Horizon oil spill.

== Personal life ==
In 1947, Harte married Janet Frey, with whom he had two sons, Christopher and William Harte, and two daughters, Elizabeth Owens and Julia Widdowson. His 52-year marriage ended upon his wife's death in 1999. He died 12 years later at his retirement home in Scarborough, Maine, at the age of 88.
