= Vice presidency of Dick Cheney =

U.S. vice presidential tenure from 2001 to 2009

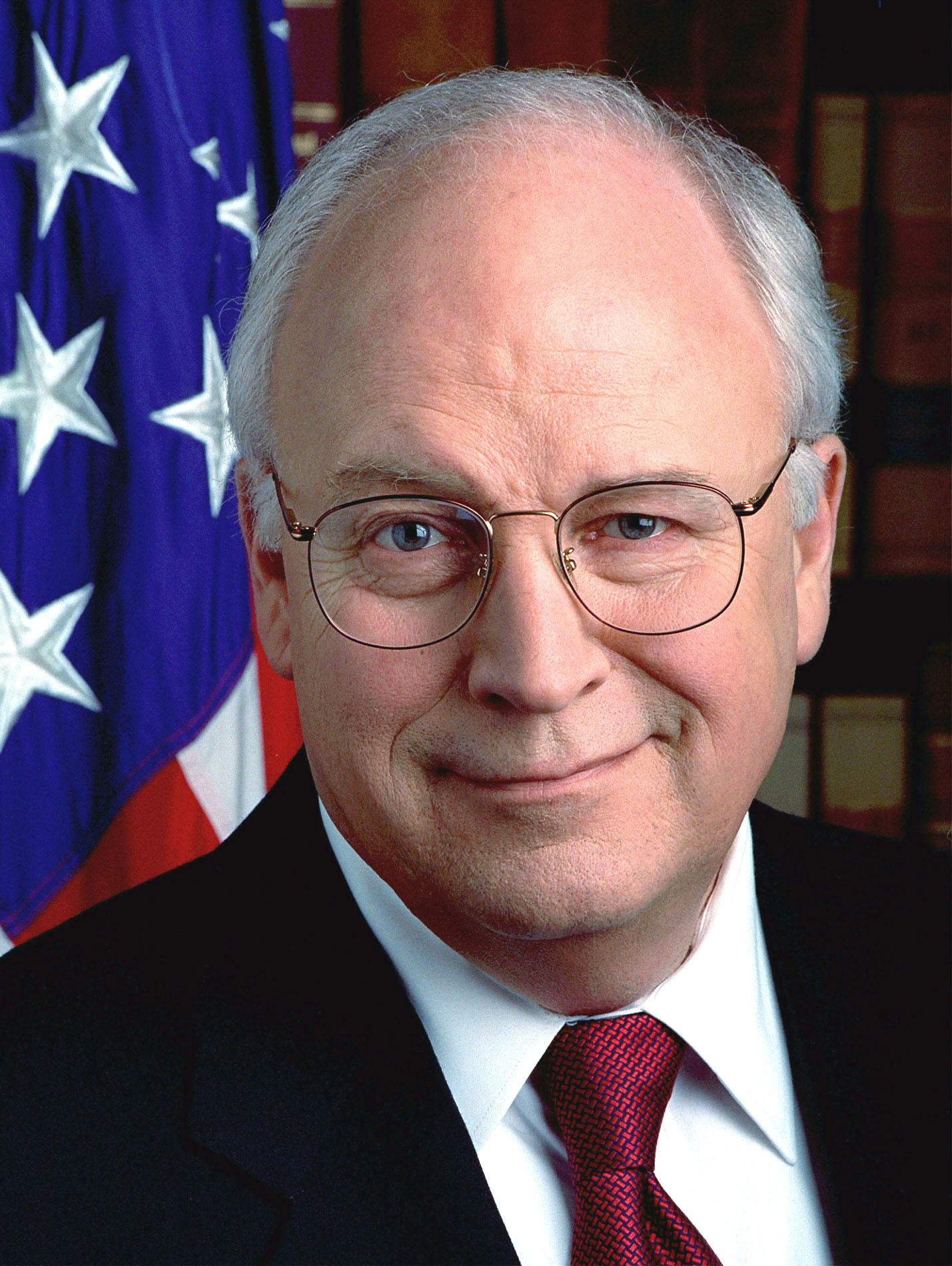
- Official portrait, 2001
- Vice presidency of Dick Cheney; January 20, 2001 – January 20, 2009
- President: George W. Bush
- Cabinet: See list
- Party: Republican
- Election: 2000; 2004
- Seat: Number One Observatory Circle
- Seal of the Vice President

Dick Cheney served as the 46th vice president of the United States during the presidency of George W. Bush from January 20, 2001, to January 20, 2009. Cheney, a member of the Republican Party, who previously served as the 17th U.S. secretary of defense from 1989 to 1993, was selected as Bush's running mate and took office following their electoral college victory in the 2000 presidential election over Democratic nominees Al Gore and Joe Lieberman. Four years later, in the 2004 presidential election, they defeated Democratic nominees, John Kerry and John Edwards, to win re-election. Cheney was regarded as the most powerful vice president in US history. He was also considered by many to be the chief architect of the Iraq War.

Alongside Cheney's vice presidency, the Republican Party also held their majorities in the House of Representatives and the Senate during the 108th and 109th U.S. Congresses following the 2002 and 2004 elections, attained an overall federal government trifecta. During Cheney's tenure as vice president, he played a leading behind-the-scenes role in the Bush administration's response to the September 11 attacks and coordination of the war on terror. His peak approval rating in the wake of the September 11 attacks was 68 percent. Cheney was an early proponent of the Iraq War, with unsubstantiated allegations that the Saddam Hussein regime possessed weapons of mass destruction and had an operational relationship with Al-Qaeda. He also pressured the intelligence community to provide intelligence consistent with the administration's rationales for invading Iraq. Cheney was often criticized for the Bush administration's policies regarding the campaign against terrorism, his support of wiretapping by the National Security Agency (NSA), and his endorsement of the U.S.'s "enhanced interrogation" torture program. In 2007, Cheney survived an assassination attempt in Afghanistan.

Near the end of his tenure, Cheney did not run for president as the Republican nominee in the 2008 presidential election and endorsed John McCain, who became the nominee and selected Alaska governor Sarah Palin as his running mate. They lost the 2008 election to the Democratic ticket of junior Illinois senator Barack Obama and his running mate, senior Delaware senator Joe Biden. As vice president in his capacity as the president of the Senate, Cheney oversaw the certification of Obama and Biden as the winners of the election on January 8, 2009. Bush and Cheney were succeeded in office by Obama and Biden on January 20, 2009. Cheney ended his vice presidential tenure as a deeply unpopular figure in American politics, with an approval rating of 13 percent.

== First term (2001–2005) ==
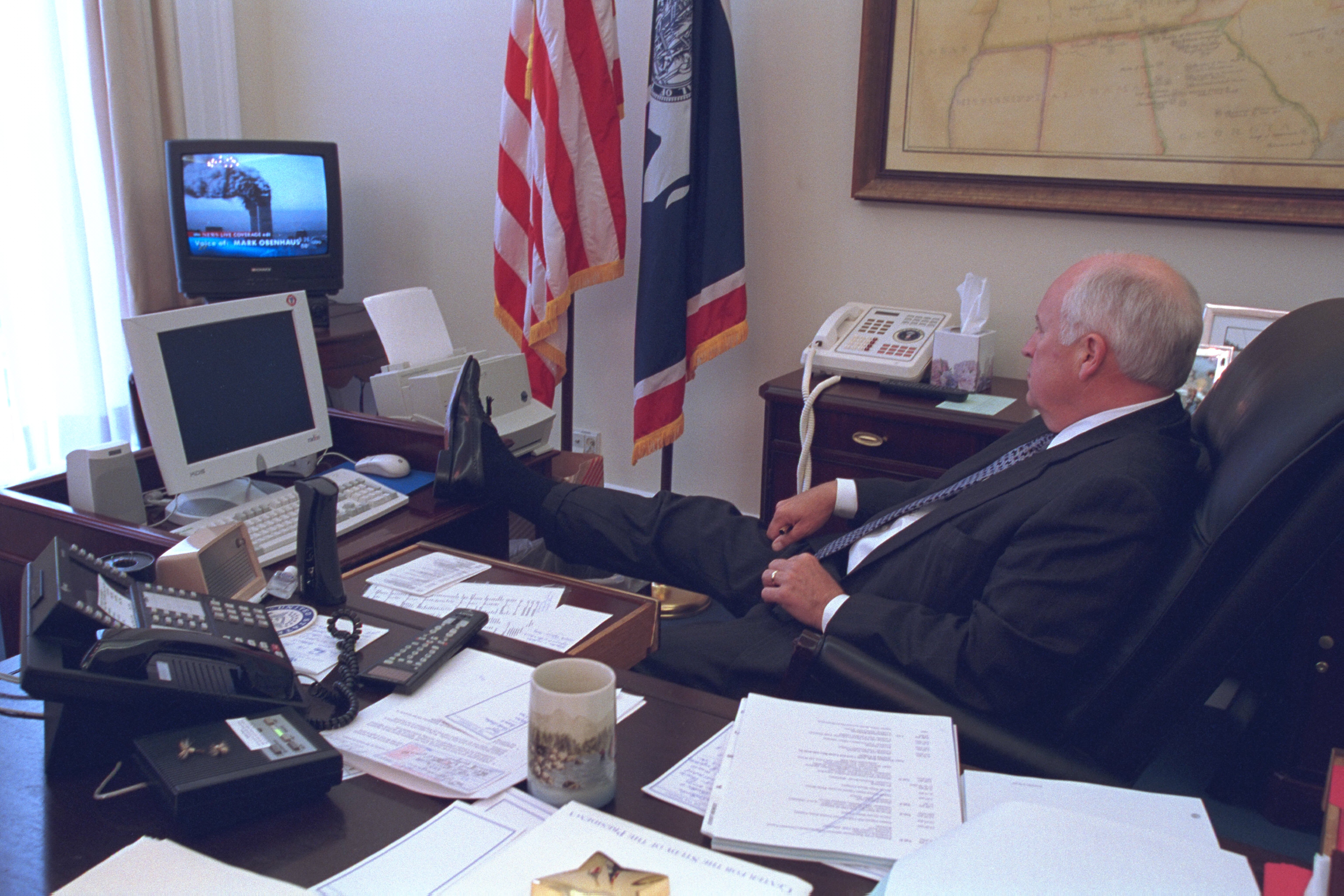
Cheney watching the initial 9/11 attack

Cheney is regarded as the most powerful vice president in the history of the United States. Cheney succeeded the Vice presidency of Al Gore.

Following the September 11, 2001, attacks, Cheney remained physically apart from Bush for security reasons. For a period, Cheney stayed at a variety of undisclosed locations, out of public view. Cheney later revealed in his memoir In My Time that these "undisclosed locations" included his official vice presidential residence, his home in Wyoming, and Camp David. He also utilized a heavy security detail, employing a motorcade of 12 to 18 government vehicles for his daily commute from the vice presidential residence at Number One Observatory Circle to the White House.

On the morning of June 29, 2002, Cheney served as acting president from 7:09 a.m. to 9:24 a.m., under the terms of the 25th Amendment to the Constitution, while Bush underwent a colonoscopy.

=== Iraq War ===
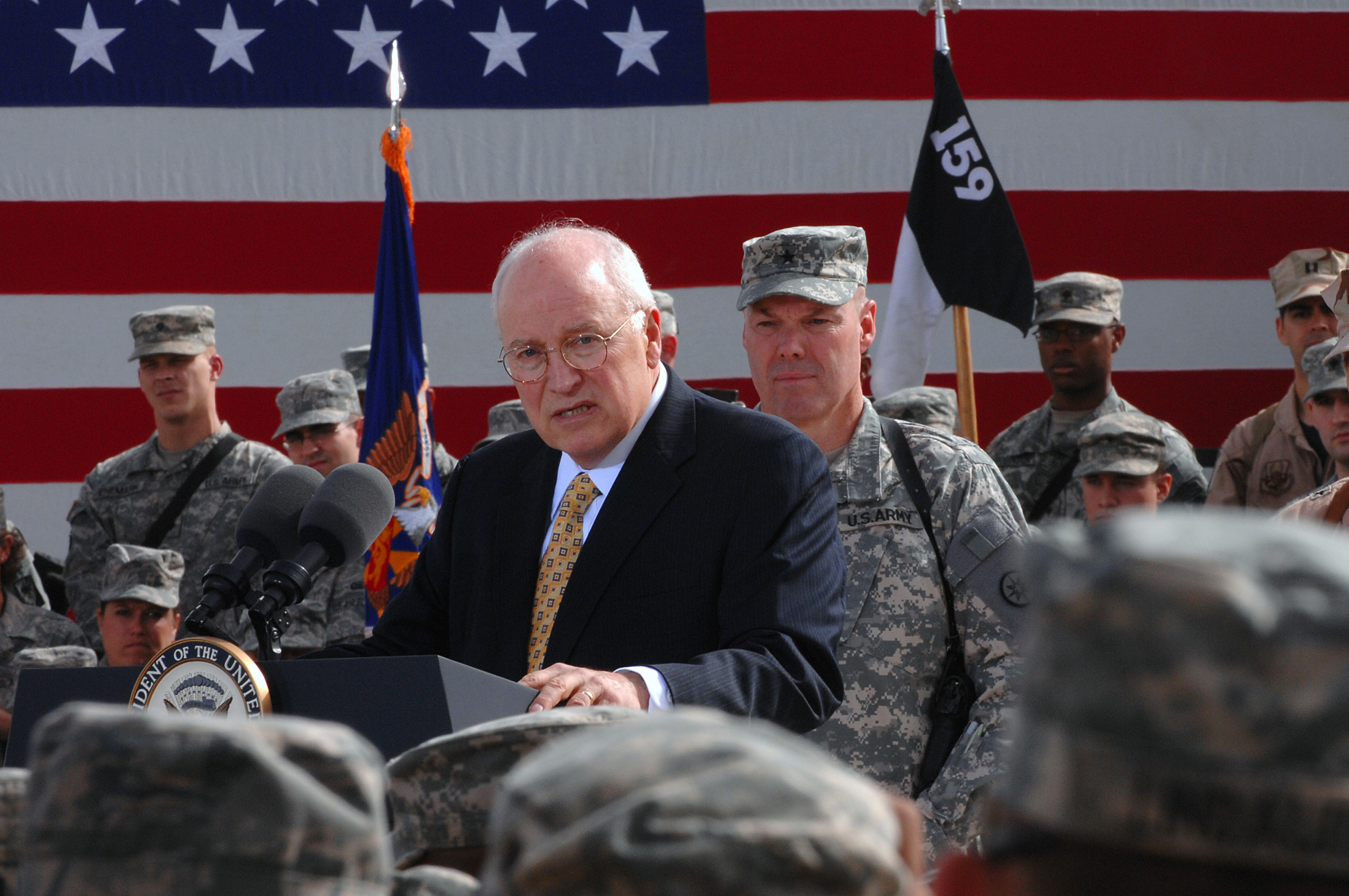
Cheney speaks to US troops at Camp Anaconda, Iraq, in 2008.

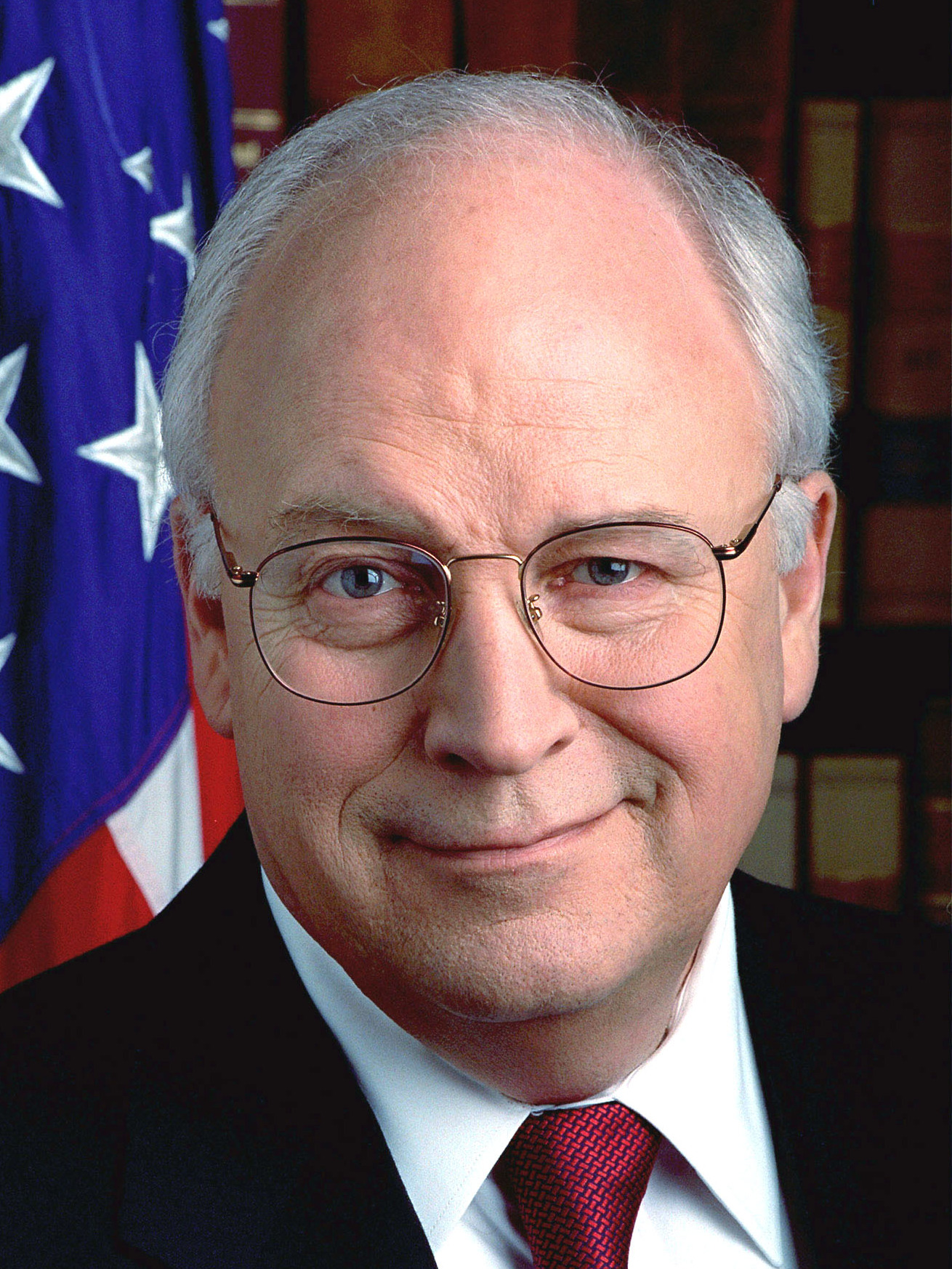
Official portrait, 2001

Following 9/11, Cheney was instrumental in providing a primary justification for a renewed war against Iraq. Cheney helped shape Bush's approach to the "war on terror", making numerous public statements alleging Iraq possessed weapons of mass destruction, and making several personal visits to CIA headquarters, where he questioned mid-level agency analysts on their conclusions. Cheney continued to allege links between Saddam Hussein and al-Qaeda, even though President Bush received a classified President's Daily Brief on September 21, 2001, indicating the U.S. intelligence community had no evidence linking Saddam Hussein to the September 11 attacks and that "there was scant credible evidence that Iraq had any significant collaborative ties with Al Qaeda." Furthermore, in 2004, the 9/11 Commission concluded that there was no "collaborative relationship" between Iraq and al-Qaeda. By 2014, Cheney continued to misleadingly claim that Saddam "had a 10-year relationship with al Qaeda."

Following the US invasion of Iraq, Cheney remained steadfast in his support of the war, stating that it would be an "enormous success story", and made many visits to the country. He often criticized war critics, calling them "opportunists" who were peddling "cynical and pernicious falsehoods" to gain political advantage while US soldiers died in Iraq. In response, Senator John Kerry asserted, "It is hard to name a government official with less credibility on Iraq [than Cheney]."

In a March 24, 2008, extended interview conducted in Ankara, Turkey, with ABC News correspondent Martha Raddatz on the fifth anniversary of the original U.S. military assault on Iraq, Cheney responded to a question about public opinion polls showing that Americans had lost confidence in the war by simply replying "So?" This remark prompted widespread criticism, including from former Oklahoma Republican Congressman Mickey Edwards, a long-time personal friend of Cheney.

== Second term (2005–2009) ==
The Bush–Cheney ticket won the 2004 presidential election with 50.7% of the popular vote and 286 electoral votes.

Bush and Cheney were re-elected in the 2004 presidential election, running against John Kerry and his running mate, John Edwards. During the election, the pregnancy of his daughter Mary and her sexual orientation as a lesbian became a source of public attention for Cheney in light of the same-sex marriage debate. Cheney has since stated that he is in favor of gay marriages personally, but that each individual U.S. state should decide whether to permit it or not. Cheney's former chief legal counsel, David Addington, became his chief of staff and remained in that office until Cheney's departure from office. John P. Hannah served as Cheney's national security adviser. Until his indictment and resignation in 2005, I. Lewis "Scooter" Libby Jr. served in both roles.

On the morning of July 21, 2007, Cheney once again served as acting president, from 7:16 am to 9:21 am. Bush transferred the power of the presidency prior to undergoing a medical procedure, requiring sedation, and later resumed his powers and duties that same day.

After his term began in 2001, Cheney was occasionally asked if he was interested in the Republican nomination for the 2008 presidential election. However, he always maintained that he wished to retire upon the expiration of his term and he did not run in the 2008 presidential primaries. The Republicans nominated Arizona Senator John McCain.

=== Disclosure of documents ===
Cheney was a prominent member of the National Energy Policy Development Group (NEPDG), commonly known as the Energy Task Force, composed of energy industry representatives, including several Enron executives. After the Enron scandal, the Bush administration was accused of improper political and business ties. In July 2003, the Supreme Court ruled that the US Department of Commerce must disclose NEPDG documents, containing references to companies that had made agreements with the previous Iraqi government to extract Iraq's petroleum.

Beginning in 2003, Cheney's staff opted not to file required reports with the National Archives and Records Administration office charged with assuring that the executive branch protects classified information, nor did it allow inspection of its record keeping. Cheney refused to release the documents, citing his executive privilege to deny congressional information requests. Media outlets such as Time magazine and CBS News questioned whether Cheney had created a "fourth branch of government" that was not subject to any laws. A group of historians and open-government advocates filed a lawsuit in the US District Court for the District of Columbia, asking the court to declare that Cheney's vice-presidential records are covered by the Presidential Records Act of 1978 and cannot be destroyed, taken or withheld from the public without proper review.

=== CIA leak scandal ===
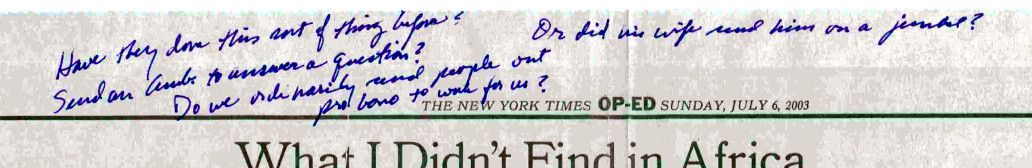
Handwritten note above Joe Wilson's editorial by Cheney referring to the covert agent before the leak took place

On October 18, 2005, The Washington Post reported that the vice president's office was central to the investigation of the Valerie Plame CIA leak scandal, for Cheney's former chief of staff, Lewis "Scooter" Libby, was one of the figures under investigation. Libby resigned his positions as Cheney's chief of staff and assistant on national security affairs later in the month after he was indicted.

In February 2006, The National Journal reported that Libby had stated before a grand jury that his superiors, including Cheney, had authorized him to disclose classified information to the press regarding intelligence on Iraq's weapons. That September, Richard Armitage, former Deputy Secretary of State, publicly announced that he was the source of the revelation of Plame's status. Armitage said he was not a part of a conspiracy to reveal Plame's identity and did not know whether one existed.

On March 6, 2007, Libby was convicted on four felony counts for obstruction of justice, perjury, and making false statements to federal investigators. In his closing arguments, independent prosecutor Patrick Fitzgerald said that there was "a cloud over the vice president", an apparent reference to Cheney's interview with FBI agents investigating the case, which was made public in 2009. Cheney lobbied President George W. Bush vigorously and unsuccessfully to grant Libby a full presidential pardon up to the day of Barack Obama's inauguration, likening Libby to a "soldier on the battlefield". Libby was subsequently pardoned by President Donald Trump in April 2018.

=== Shooting of Harry Whittington ===
On February 11, 2006, Cheney shot Harry Whittington, a then-78-year-old Texas attorney, with a 28-gauge Perazzi shotgun while participating in a quail hunt on a ranch in Riviera, Texas. Both Cheney and Whittington called the event an accident.

The incident was reported to the Corpus Christi Caller-Times on February 12, 2006, by ranch owner Katherine Armstrong. The Bush administration disclosed the shooting incident to the public the afternoon of February 12. Local authorities released a report on the shooting on February 16, 2006, and witness statements on February 22.

On February 14, 2006, Whittington suffered a non-fatal heart attack and atrial fibrillation due to at least one lead shot lodged in or near his heart. He also had a collapsed lung. Cheney did not speak publicly about the incident until February 15 in an interview with Fox News. Early reports indicated that Cheney and Whittington were friends and that the injuries were minor. Whittington later clarified that he and Cheney were not close friends but acquaintances.

The sheriff's office released a report on the shooting on February 16, 2006, and witness statements on February 22, indicating that the shooting occurred on a clear sunny day, and Whittington was shot from 30 or 40 yards (40 m) away while searching for a downed bird. Armstrong, the ranch owner, claimed that all in the hunting party were wearing blaze-orange safety gear and none had been drinking. However, Cheney has acknowledged that he had one beer four or five hours prior to the shooting. Although Kenedy County Sheriff's Office documents support the official story by Cheney and his party, re-creations of the incident produced by George Gongora and John Metz of the Corpus Christi Caller-Times indicated that the actual shooting distance was closer than the 30 yards claimed.

The incident hurt Cheney's popularity standing in the polls. According to polls on February 27, 2006, two weeks after the accident, Dick Cheney's approval rating had dropped 5 percentage points to 18%. The incident became the subject of a number of jokes and satire.

=== Assassination attempt ===
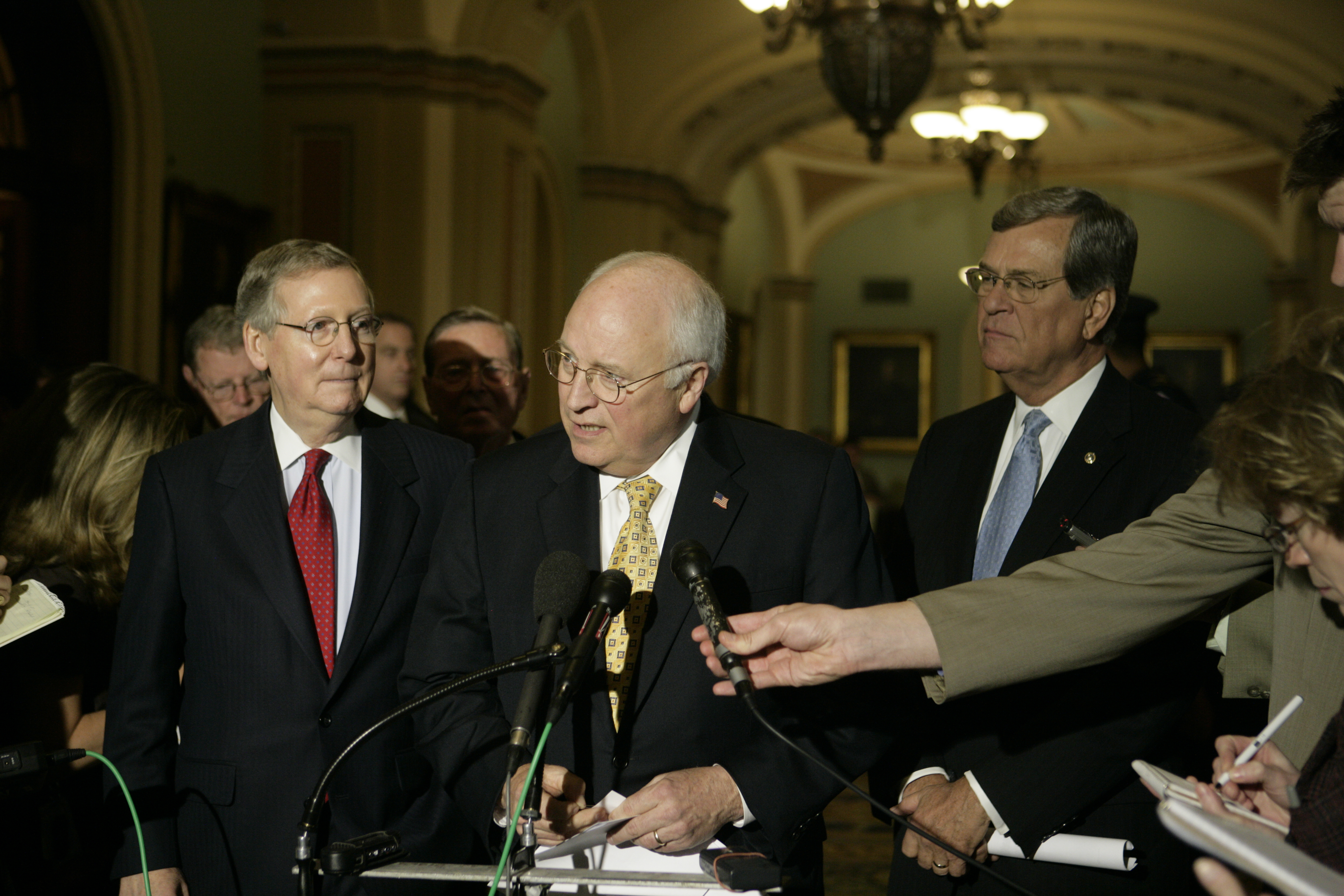
Vice President Cheney speaks to the press flanked by fellow Republicans Mitch McConnell (left) and Trent Lott (right), April 2007.

On February 27, 2007, at about 10 am, a suicide bomber killed 23 people and wounded 20 more outside Bagram Airfield in Afghanistan during a visit by Cheney. The Taliban claimed responsibility for the attack and declared that Cheney was its intended target. They also claimed that Osama bin Laden supervised the operation. The bomb went off outside the front gate while Cheney was inside the base and half a mile away. He reported hearing the blast, saying "I heard a loud boom... The Secret Service came in and told me there had been an attack on the main gate." The purpose of Cheney's visit to the region had been to press Pakistan for a united front against the Taliban.

== Policy formulation ==
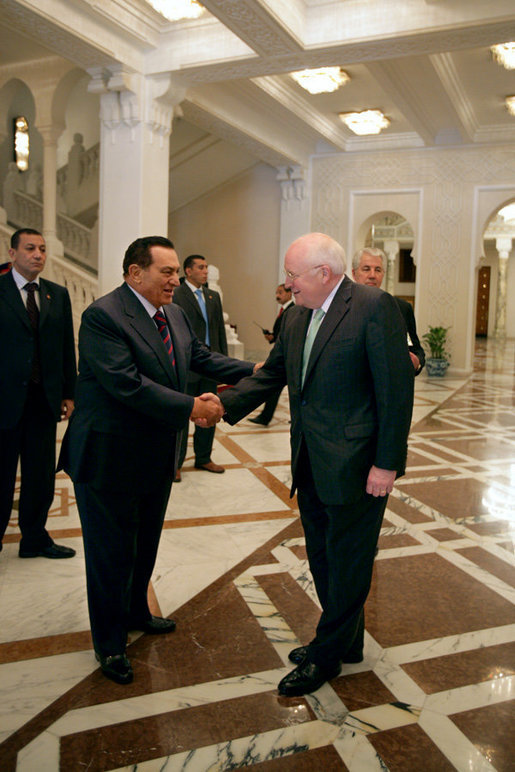
Cheney shakes hands with Egyptian President Hosni Mubarak at the Presidential Palace in Cairo, May 2007.

Cheney has been characterized as the most powerful and influential Vice President in history. Both supporters and critics of Cheney regard him as a shrewd and knowledgeable politician who knows the functions and intricacies of the federal government. A sign of Cheney's active policy-making role was then-House Speaker Dennis Hastert's provision of an office near the House floor for Cheney in addition to his office in the West Wing, his ceremonial office in the Old Executive Office Building, and his Senate offices (one in the Dirksen Senate Office Building and another off the floor of the Senate).

Cheney has actively promoted an expansion of the powers of the presidency, saying that the Bush administration's "challenges to the laws which Congress passed after Vietnam and Watergate to contain and oversee the executive branch – the Foreign Intelligence Surveillance Act, the Presidential Records Act, the Freedom of Information Act and the War Powers Resolution – are 'a restoration, if you will, of the power and authority of the president.'"

In June 2007, The Washington Post summarized Cheney's vice presidency in a Pulitzer Prize-winning four-part series, based in part on interviews with former administration officials. The articles characterized Cheney not as a "shadow" president, but as someone who usually has the last words of counsel to the president on policies, which in many cases would reshape the powers of the presidency. When former Vice President Dan Quayle suggested to Cheney that the office was largely ceremonial, Cheney reportedly replied, "I have a different understanding with the president." The articles described Cheney as having a secretive approach to the tools of government, indicated by the use of his own security classification and three man-sized safes in his offices.

The articles described Cheney's influence on decisions pertaining to detention of suspected terrorists and the legal limits that apply to their questioning, especially what constitutes torture. U.S. Army Colonel Lawrence Wilkerson, who served as Colin Powell's chief of staff when he was both Chairman of the Joint Chiefs of Staff at the same time Cheney was Secretary of Defense, and then later when Powell was Secretary of State, stated in an in-depth interview that Cheney and Donald Rumsfeld established an alternative program to interrogate post-9/11 detainees because of their mutual distrust of CIA.

The Washington Post articles, principally written by Barton Gellman, further characterized Cheney as having the strongest influence within the administration in shaping budget and tax policy in a manner that assures "conservative orthodoxy." They also highlighted Cheney's behind-the-scenes influence on the Bush administration's environmental policy to ease pollution controls for power plants, facilitate the disposal of nuclear waste, open access to federal timber resources, and avoid federal constraints on greenhouse gas emissions, among other issues. The articles characterized his approach to policy formulation as favoring business over the environment.

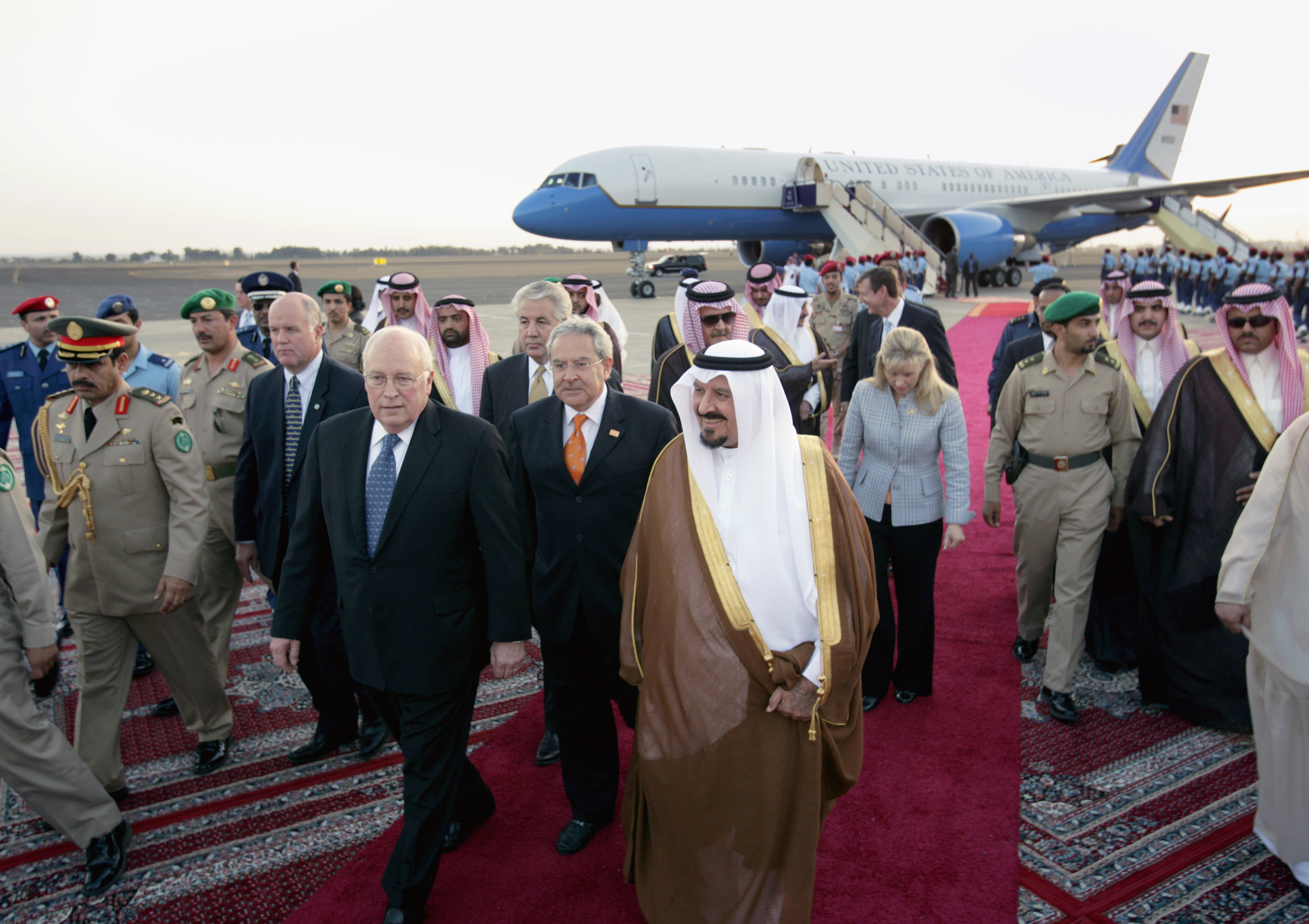
Cheney walks with Saudi Crown Prince Sultan bin Abdulaziz, May 2007.

In June 2008, Cheney allegedly attempted to block efforts by Secretary of State Condoleezza Rice to strike a controversial US compromise deal with North Korea over the communist state's nuclear program.

In July 2008, a former Environmental Protection Agency official stated publicly that Cheney's office had pushed significantly for large-scale deletions from a Centers for Disease Control and Prevention report on the health effects of global warming "fearing the presentation by a leading health official might make it harder to avoid regulating greenhouse gases." In October, when the report appeared with six pages cut from the testimony, the White House stated that the changes were made due to concerns regarding the accuracy of the science. However, according to the former senior adviser on climate change to Environmental Protection Agency Administrator Stephen Johnson, Cheney's office was directly responsible for nearly half of the original testimony being deleted.

In his role as President of the U.S. Senate, Cheney broke with the Bush Administration Department of Justice, and signed an amicus brief to the United States Supreme Court in the case of Heller v. District of Columbia that successfully challenged gun laws in the nation's capital on Second Amendment grounds.

On February 14, 2010, in an appearance on ABC's This Week, Cheney reiterated his support of waterboarding and for the torture of captured terrorist suspects, saying, "I was and remain a strong proponent of our enhanced interrogation program."

== Senate presidency ==
=== List of tie-breaking votes cast by Dick Cheney ===
As President of the Senate, Cheney cast several tie-breaking votes in order to pass legislation.

| Date | Action | Vote | Ultimate result |
|---|---|---|---|
| April 3, 2001 | S.Amdt. 173 (Grassley Prescription Drug Reserve Fund Amendment) to H.Con.Res. 83 (2002 budget) | Yea: 51–50 | Agreed to. |
| April 5, 2001 | S.Amdt. 347 (Hutchison Marriage Penalty Tax Elimination Amendment) to H.Con.Res. 83 (2002 budget) | Yea: 51–50 | Agreed to. |
| May 21, 2002 | Motion to table S.Amdt. 3406 (Allen Mortgage Loan Amendment) to H.R. 3009 (Trade Act of 2002) | Yea: 50–49 | Motion agreed to. |
| April 11, 2003 | H.Con.Res. 95 (2004 budget) | Yea: 51–50 | Enacted. |
| May 15, 2003 | S.Amdt. 664 (Nickles Dividend Exclusion Amendment) to S. 1054 (Jobs and Growth Tax Relief Reconciliation Act of 2003) | Yea: 51–50 | S. 1054 incorporated into H.R. 2 (see below), which was enacted as Pub. L. 108–27 (text) (PDF). |
| May 23, 2003 | H.R. 2 (Jobs and Growth Tax Relief Reconciliation Act of 2003) Conference Report | Yea: 51–50 | Enacted. Pub. L. 108–27 (text) (PDF) |
| December 21, 2005 | Motion to concur in the House amendment to S. 1932 with an amendment (Personal Responsibility, Work, and Family Promotion Act of 2005) | Yea: 51–50 | Motion agreed to. Bill enacted, Pub. L. 109–171 (text) (PDF). |
| March 13, 2008 | Motion to reconsider S.Amdt. 4189 to S.Con.Res. 70 | Yea: 51–50 | Motion agreed to. |

== Public perception ==
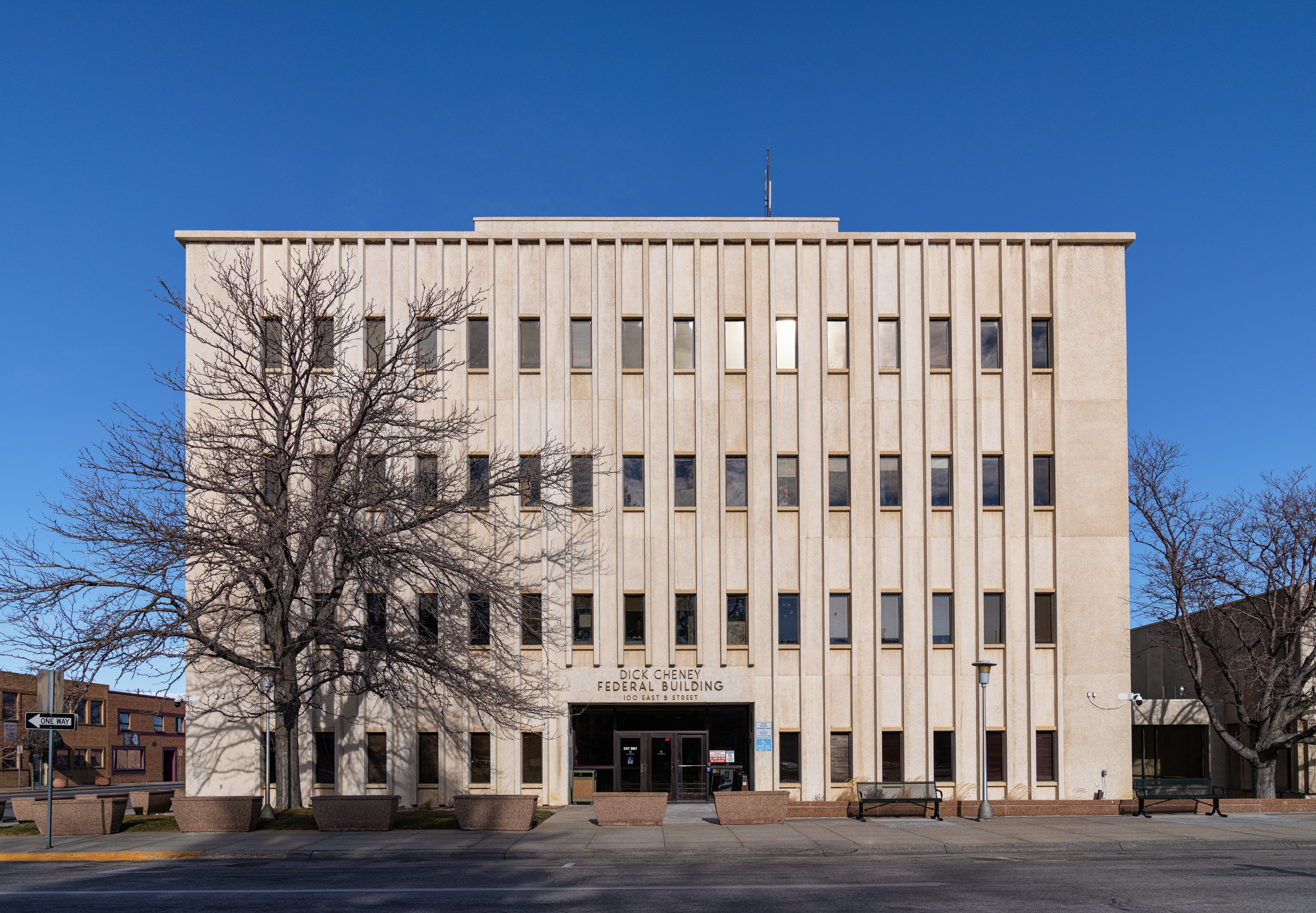
The Dick Cheney Federal Building in Casper, Wyoming

Cheney's early public opinion polls were more favorable than unfavorable, reaching his peak approval rating in the wake of the September 11 attacks at 68 percent. However, polling numbers for both him and the president gradually declined in their second terms, with Cheney reaching his lowest point shortly before leaving office at 13 percent. Cheney's Gallup poll figures are mostly consistent with those from other polls:

- April 2001 – 63% approval, 21% disapproval
- January 2002 – 68% approval, 18% disapproval
- January 2004 – 56% approval, 36% disapproval
- January 2005 – 50% approval, 40% disapproval
- January 2006 – 41% approval, 46% disapproval
- July 2007 – 30% approval, 60% disapproval
- March 2009 – 30% approval, 63% disapproval

In April 2007, Cheney was awarded an honorary doctorate of public service by Brigham Young University, where he delivered the commencement address. His selection as commencement speaker was controversial. The college board of trustees issued a statement explaining that the invitation should be viewed "as one extended to someone holding the high office of vice president of the United States rather than to a partisan political figure". BYU permitted a protest to occur so long as it did not "make personal attacks against Cheney, attack (the) BYU administration, the church or the First Presidency".

=== In popular culture ===
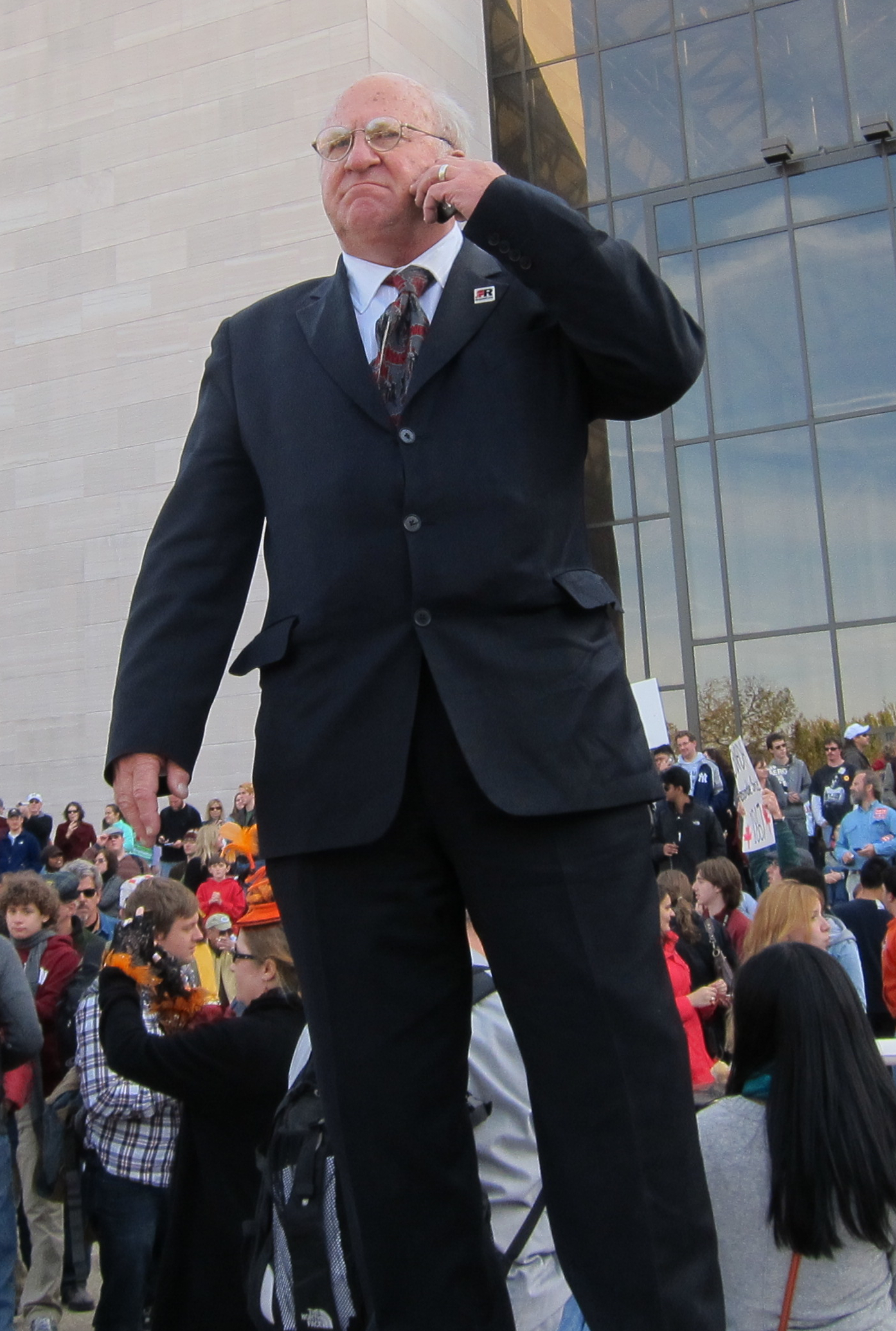
A Dick Cheney impersonator at the 2010 Rally to Restore Sanity and/or Fear

- In Eminem's 2002 single "Without Me", where the lines "I know that you got a job, Ms. Cheney / But your husband's heart problem's complicated" refer to his health problems.
- In The Day After Tomorrow, the character Raymond Becker (played by Kenneth Welsh) is intended to be a criticism of Dick Cheney.
- In W. (2008), a biographical comedy-drama film directed by Oliver Stone, he is portrayed by Richard Dreyfuss.
- In War Dogs (2016), where the line "God bless Dick Cheney's America" refers to his support of American military presence in Iraq.
- In Who Is America? (2018), a political satire series, Sacha Baron Cohen pranked Cheney into signing a makeshift waterboard kit.
- In Vice (2018), a biographical comedy-drama film written and directed by Adam McKay, Cheney is portrayed by Christian Bale, for which the latter won a Golden Globe and was nominated for the Academy Award for Best Actor.
- In Mrs. America (2020), a historical drama television miniseries produced by FX, Cheney is portrayed by Andrew Hodwitz.
- Bob Rivers did a parody cover called "Cheney's Got a Gun"
- In an episode entitled "Dick Cheney" during the first-season run of the dramedy Patriot aired on Amazon Prime, protagonist John Lakeman shoots his rival with a shotgun while the two were conducting a duck hunt, referencing events surrounding the Dick Cheney hunting accident.

== Legacy ==
Cheney was cited as the most powerful vice president in American history. He was compared to Darth Vader, a characterization originated by his critics, but which was later adopted humorously by Cheney himself as well as by members of his family and staff. When Joe Biden succeeded Cheney as vice president, Biden said he intended to eliminate some explicit roles assumed by Cheney, and did not intend to emulate any previous vice presidency. However, at the end of Biden's vice presidency, his high level of influence as vice president was seen as second only to Cheney.

In Jon Meacham's book Destiny and Power: The American Odyssey of George Herbert Walker Bush, published in November 2015, the 41st president, although also laudatory of Cheney, is in part critical of the former vice president, whom Bush describes as "having his own empire" and "very hard-line." Cheney opposed Donald Trump in the 2024 presidential election, and endorsed Joe Biden's vice president Kamala Harris over Trump.

As a result of Cheney having admitted that he "signed off" on the so-called "enhanced interrogation techniques" program, some public officials, as well as several media outlets and advocacy groups, called for his prosecution under various anti-torture and war crimes statutes.

== Elections during the Cheney vice presidency ==
Congressional party leaders
| | | Senate leaders | | House leaders | |
| Congress | Year | Majority | Minority | Speaker | Minority |
|---|---|---|---|---|---|
| 107th | 2001 | Lott (Note: With Republican vice president Dick Cheney provides the tie-breaking vote, the Republicans also holding a majority in the Senate since January 20, 2001. In June 2001, Jim Jeffords left the Republican Party and began caucusing with the Democrats, giving the Democrats a majority.) | Daschle | Hastert | Gephardt |
| 107th | 2001–2002 | Daschle | Lott | Hastert | Gephardt |
| 108th | 2003–2004 | Frist | Daschle | Hastert | Pelosi |
| 109th | 2005–2006 | Frist | Reid | Hastert | Pelosi |
| 110th | 2007–2008 | Reid | McConnell | Pelosi | Boehner |
| 111th (Note: 17 days of the 107th Congress (January 3, 2001 – January 19, 2001) took place under Vice President Gore, and 17 days of the 111th Congress (January 3, 2009 – January 19, 2009) took place during Cheney's vice presidency.) | 2009 | Reid | McConnell | Pelosi | Boehner |

Republican seats in Congress
| Congress | Senate | House |
|---|---|---|
| 107th | 50 | 221 |
| 108th | 51 | 229 |
| 109th | 55 | 232 |
| 110th | 49 | 202 |
| 111th | 41 | 178 |

== See also ==
- Presidency of George W. Bush
- Electoral history of Dick Cheney

== Bibliography ==
- Andrews, Elaine K. (2001). Dick Cheney: A Life in Public Service. Brookfield, Conn: Millbrook Press. ISBN 0-7613-2306-6.
- Baker, Peter (2013). Days of Fire: Bush and Cheney in the White House. New York: Doubleday. ISBN 978-0385525183.
- Gellman, Barton (2008). Angler: The Cheney Vice Presidency. New York: Penguin Press. ISBN 978-1-59420-186-8.
- Goldstein, Joel K. (August 31, 2009). Cheney, Vice Presidential Power and the War on Terror. Toronto: APSA Meeting Paper. SSRN 1450601.
- Hayes, Stephen F. (2007). Cheney: The Untold Story of America's Most Powerful and Controversial Vice President. New York: HarperCollins. ISBN 978-0-06-072346-0.
- Goldstein, Joel K. "The contemporary presidency: Cheney, vice presidential power, and the war on terror." Presidential Studies Quarterly 40.1 (2010): 102–139. online
- Mann, James (2004). Rise of the Vulcans: The History of Bush's War Cabinet. New York: Penguin Books. ISBN 0-670-03299-9.
- Nichols, John (2004). Dick: The Man Who Is President. New York: New Press. ISBN 1-56584-840-3.
