= Bernard Hanks =

Co-founder of Harte Hanks

Bernard Hanks (September 19, 1884 – December 12, 1948) was a co-founder of the media company Harte Hanks. After attending Baylor University, Hanks worked for a time in the grocery business, but was soon working for the Abilene Daily Reporter. He began managing the newspaper some time in the 1920s, around the time that he met the owner of the San Angelo Standard-Times, Houston Harte. They went on to found what became the Harte Hanks newspaper chain, which eventually evolved into a marketing company.
