= National Centers for Environmental Information =

Active US archive of environmental data

Agency overview
- Formed: 2015
- Preceding agencies: National Climatic Data Center; National Geophysical Data Center; National Oceanographic Data Center
- Jurisdiction: United States government
- Headquarters: Asheville, North Carolina
- Employees: approximately 500
- Annual budget: $71.4 million (2023)
- Agency executives: Deke Arndt, Director; Joe Pica, Deputy Director
- Parent agency: National Environmental Satellite, Data, and Information Service
- Website: www.ncei.noaa.gov

The National Centers for Environmental Information (NCEI) is a U.S. government agency that manages one of the world's largest archives of atmospheric, coastal, geophysical, and oceanic data. The current director is Deke Arndt.

NCEI is operated by the National Environmental Satellite, Data, and Information Service (NESDIS), an office of the National Oceanic and Atmospheric Administration (NOAA), which operates under the U.S. Department of Commerce.

In addition to archiving data, NCEI develops products and services that make data available to scientists, government officials, the business community, academia, non-governmental organizations, and the general public.

NCEI provides environmental data, products, and services covering the depths of the ocean to the surface of the Sun.

== History ==
=== Formation ===
NCEI was created in 2015 from the merger of three NOAA data centers:

- National Climatic Data Center (NCDC)
- National Geophysical Data Center (NGDC)
- National Oceanographic Data Center (NODC), which includes the National Coastal Data Development Center (NCDDC)

NCEI was established by the Consolidated and Further Continuing Appropriations Act, 2015, Public Law 113-235 in response to increasing demand for environmental information. The organization was created by merging the three existing NOAA National Data Centers with the goal of streamlining the collection and preservation of environmental data.

The merger, which came in response to increasing demand for environmental information, was intended to make NOAA's data more useful through the application of consistent data stewardship practices across all science disciplines. NCEI works with the ISC World Data System to make data free and accessible.

=== Hurricane Helene ===
In September, 2024, the NCEI headquarters in Asheville were buffeted by storm conditions and flooding from Hurricane Helene. Severe damage was done to infrastructure, limiting network services and website availability. Archived data was rendered inaccessible, certain webpages suffered limited availability, and the monthly climate reports for September were postponed. They confirmed on October 4th that all data products, however, were safe.

== Data and Services ==
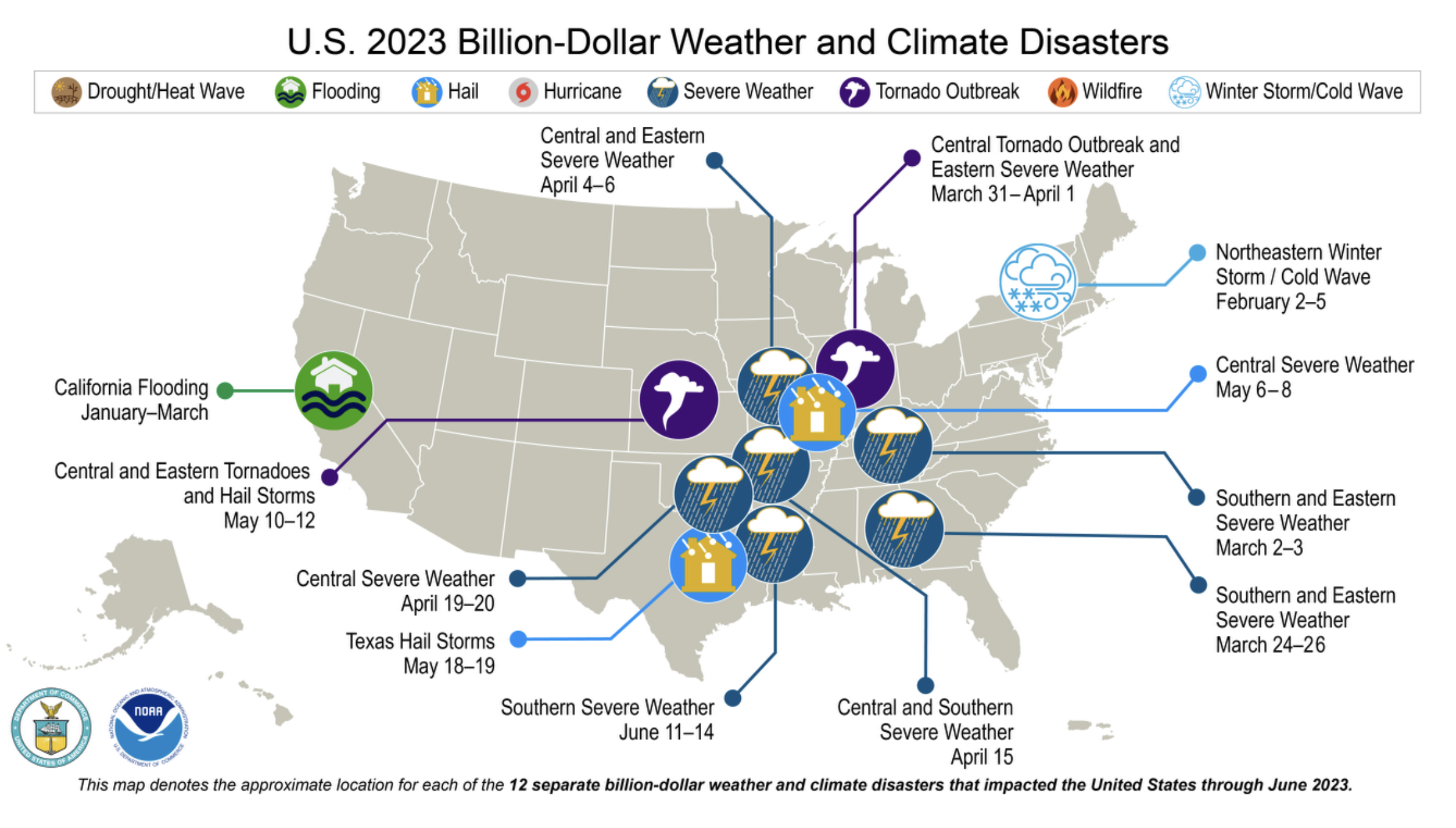
This graphic from a study by NCEI

As of mid-2023, the NCEI archive contains more than 60 petabytes of data, equivalent to more than 700 million filing cabinets filled with documents. NCEI offers users access to tens of thousands of datasets and hundreds of products. Data are collected by NOAA, other agencies and departments of the U.S. government, as well as by other institutions, organizations, and governments around the world. This is in addition to a physical archive in a climate-controlled storage facility containing thousands of boxes of data recorded on paper, reels of microfilm, and microfiche.

Information about the past demonstrates the potential to have positive impacts on people's quality of life. Environmental data offer a picture of our atmosphere, land, ocean, seafloor, and space that inform current and future decisions. NOAA and other institutions, organizations, and governments in the U.S. and around the world collect the data that NCEI preserves.

Satellites, land-based stations, ocean buoys, ships, remotely operated underwater vehicles, weather balloons, radar, forecasting and climate models, and palaeoclimatological research collect the environmental data. The data and products offer information about climate and weather, coasts, oceans, and geophysics.

Environmental data are collected from many sources, including satellites, land-based stations, ocean buoys, ships, remotely operated underwater vehicles, weather balloons, radar, forecasting and climate models, and paleoclimatological research. Once transmitted to NCEI, data are archived and made available for use by researchers and others in public and private sectors. The data and products offer information about climate and weather, coasts, oceans, and geophysics.

=== Subject Matter Experts (SMEs) ===
NCEI's SMEs are sought-after collaborators on national and international research projects. In 2022, they collaborated with scientists from across the globe to produce world-class research. Areas of study were as varied as the environmental data housed at NCEI: hurricanes, drought, ocean warming, fire science, solar flares, artificial intelligence, marine microplastics, and many more.

In 2022, NCEI SMEs authored more than 90 papers in peer-reviewed journals. That averages to eight papers per month, and NCEI SMEs were the lead authors in 42% of those papers. The papers were published in 56 different scientific journals, including some of the most-cited journals: Scientific Reports, Science of the Total Environment, Nature Climate Change, Nature Communications, and The Astrophysical Journal.

== NCEI data users ==
NCEI resources are used for scientific research and commercial applications in many fields, including agriculture, forestry, marine and coastal ecosystems, tourism, transportation, civil infrastructure, energy, water resources, health, insurance, litigation, and national security.

For example, retail and manufacturing businesses use climate data to assess how weather has influenced past sales so they can better plan for the future. Corn farmers rely on NCEI data to decide how much fertilizer to apply. The reinsurance industry—which offers insurance to insurance companies—uses NCEI data to determine risks associated with natural disasters. Cattle ranchers use NCEI's weekly U.S. Drought Monitor to make decisions about land management, herd size, and feed purchases. The freight railway industry uses a number of NCEI products—including Local Climatological Data, Integrated Surface Daily Database, and Global Historical Climatology Network—to predict where tracks might be blocked by landslides and to help trains avoid the path of severe storms. U.S. fishing boats use NCEI ocean and coastal data to determine where fishing conditions are most promising. The third-party weather service industry uses NCEI data to create customized forecasts and other tools to serve a wide range of clients, such as transportation companies seeking to build facilities where fog or snow is less likely to create problems.

== Locations ==
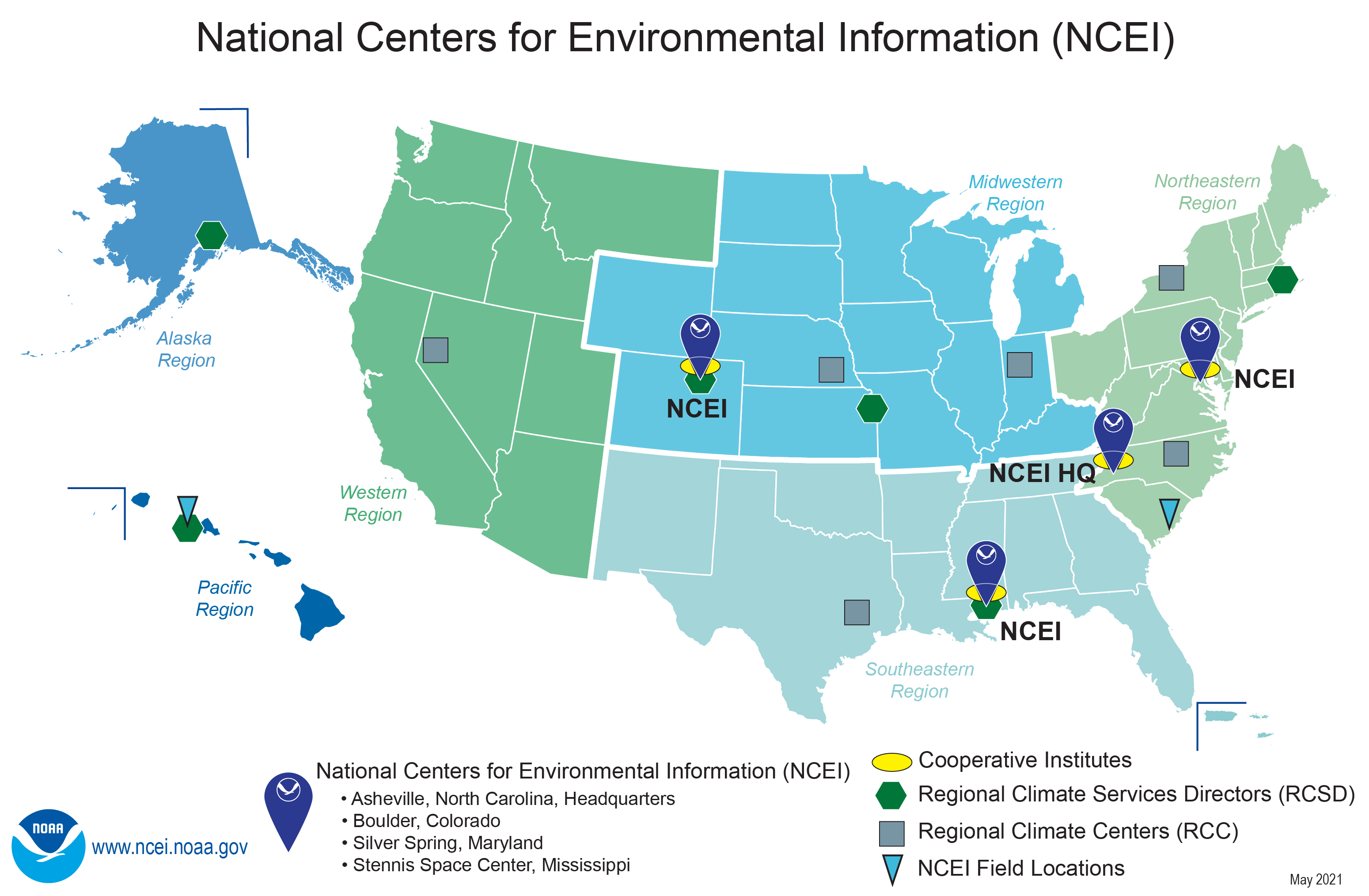
Map of NCEI Locations as of 2021

NCEI is headquartered in Asheville, North Carolina, with other primary locations in Boulder, Colorado; Silver Spring, Maryland; and Stennis Space Center in Hancock County, Mississippi.

NOAA's six Regional Climate Services Directors, which are part of NCEI, represent the Eastern, Central, Southern, Pacific, Western, and Alaska regions. They work with a broad range of partners to provide climate information specific to each region.

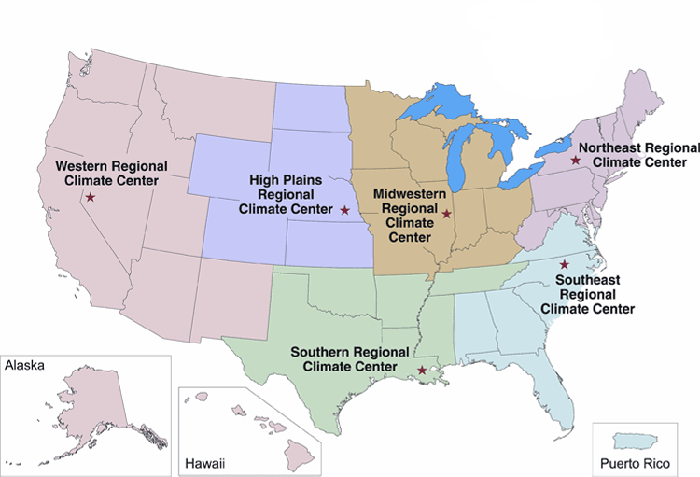
Map of NCEI's regional climate center locations and coverage areas

NCEI manages the Regional Climate Center Program, which provides services through six regional offices:

- High Plains Regional Climate Center (Lincoln, Nebraska)
- Midwestern Regional Climate Center (West Lafayette, Indiana)
- Northeast Regional Climate Center (Ithaca, New York)
- Southeast Regional Climate Center (Chapel Hill, North Carolina)
- Southern Regional Climate Center (College Station, TX)
- Western Regional Climate Center (Reno, Nevada)

NCEI partners with academic and nonprofit institutions known as cooperative institutes to conduct research and perform tasks that support its mission and goals. The cooperative institutes affiliated with NCEI are as follows:

- Cooperative Institute for Satellite Earth System Studies (CISESS)
- Cooperative Institute for Research in Environmental Sciences (CIRES)
- Northern Gulf Institute (NGI)

== See also ==
- Earth System Research Laboratories
- Environmental data rescue
- National Snow and Ice Data Center
- NOAA Central Library
- Space Weather Prediction Center
