= Harte Research Institute for Gulf of Mexico Studies =

Marine research institute in Texas

Harte Research Institute
- Established: 2000
- Endowment: US$ 46 million
- Executive Director: Dr. Greg Stunz
- Former Director: Dr. Robert Furgason, Texas A&M University–Corpus Christi President emeritus
- Senior Leadership: Dr. David Yoskowitz, Associate Director, Endowed Chair for Socio-Economics; Gail Sutton, Chief Operating Officer; Dr. James Gibeaut, Endowed Chair for Geospatial Sciences; Dr. Richard McLaughlin, Endowed Chair for Marine Policy & Law; Dr. Paul Montagna, Endowed Chair for Ecosystems & Modeling; Dr. Greg Stunz, Endowed Chair for Fisheries & Ocean Health; Dr. Wes Tunnell, Endowed Chair for Biodiversity and Conservation Science, Professor Emeritus
- Location: Corpus Christi, Texas, United States
- Campus: Ward Island, 240 acres (0.97 km^{2})
- Nickname: HRI
- Affiliations: Texas A&M University–Corpus Christi, Texas A&M University System
- Memorandums of Understanding: Fondo Mexicano para la Conservacion de la Naturaleza, Tecnologico De Monterrey, The Meadows Center for Water and the Environment, University of Mississippi, National Sea Grant Law Center, Texas Sea Grant College Program, The Nature Conservancy, Universidad Autonoma De Campeche, Unidad Mérida Del Centro de Investigacion y de Estudios Avanzados del Instituto Politecnico National, Universidad Veracruzana, Mississippi State University, Northern Gulf Institute, Universidad Autonoma de Yucatan
- Websites: www.harteresearchinstitute.org www.gulfbase.org

The Harte Research Institute (HRI) at Texas A&M University-Corpus Christi is the only marine research institute dedicated solely to advancing the long-term sustainable use and conservation of the world's ninth-largest body of water. Established in 2001, HRI integrates outstanding scientific research with public policy to provide international leadership in generating and disseminating knowledge about the Gulf of Mexico ecosystem and its critical role in the economies of the North American region.

== History ==
On September 19, 2000, the late Edward H. Harte, philanthropist and former owner of the Corpus Christi Caller-Times newspaper, donated $46 million to establish a new research institute to focus on the Gulf. The previous year, knowing that Harte, a committed conservationist, had been deeply impressed by internationally famed oceanographer Sylvia Earle’s book Sea Change: A Message of the Oceans, Texas A&M University-Corpus Christi President Robert Furgason approached him about establishing an internationally distinguished research organization focused on the exploration and sustainability of the Gulf of Mexico. While acknowledging that there were already a number of excellent marine research institutes across the country, Furgason pointed out that none focused principally on the Gulf of Mexico, despite the fact that it is a vital part of the economies of the Southern United States, Mexico and Cuba.

During the 2001 Texas Legislative Session, Dr. Furgason, with the assistance of State Rep. Robert A. Junell, obtained $15 million from the State of Texas to build a facility for the Harte Research Institute on the Texas A&M-Corpus Christi campus. An additional $3 million was added from other state building funds to allow for the construction of graduate instruction and research laboratories and offices. These labs and offices allow collaboration between Harte research scientists and faculty and students within the University’s College of Science and Engineering. Other Texas A&M University-Corpus Christi entities working cooperatively and collaboratively with HRI include:

- Center for Coastal Studies
- Center for Water Supply Studies
- Conrad Blucher Institute for Surveying and Science
- Geographic Information Science research program
- Texas Coastal Ocean Observation Network

In September 2001, Dr. John W. ("Wes") Tunnell, Jr. was appointed associate director and that fall the new institute was officially named the Harte Research Institute for Gulf of Mexico Studies. Over the next several years the organization and structure of HRI was developed, the research areas were determined, the building was constructed, and the university's first science Ph.D. program was implemented.

Following his retirement as University President, in January 2005 Dr. Furgason became HRI's first executive director. Under his leadership, HRI hired its endowed chairs as well as senior staff in several key programs; appointed 16 research assistants and associates to work in the field and HRI's high-tech laboratories; received license for its scientists and researchers to travel to Cuba; was awarded two grants to work in Cuba; and sponsored its first three underwater expeditions. On Dec. 31, 2007, Dr. Furgason retired a second time and University President Flavius Killebrew named Dr. Larry McKinney, retired director of Coastal Fisheries and senior director of Aquatic Resources for the Texas Parks and Wildlife Department, HRI Executive Director.

== The Harte Model ==
The Harte Model is organized into seven areas headed by Endowed Chairs who are among the world's leading experts in their areas of research: Coastal and Marine Geospatial Sciences; Ecosystems Studies and Modeling; Biodiversity and Conservation Science; Fisheries and Ocean Health; Marine Policy and Law; and Socio-Economics.

== International Collaboration ==
Because the Gulf of Mexico is a large marine ecosystem where there are no political boundaries to waters and biota, HRI encourages a tri-national responsibility between the United States, Mexico and Cuba in preserving the Gulf's ecosystem; ensuring its economic and ecological sustainability; and promoting the understanding that people and the environment are inexorably linked. In their work, HRI scientists cooperate and collaborate with colleagues from Mexico and Cuba whenever possible. The tri-national alliance includes members from private business (fisheries, tourism, oil and gas, etc.), state and federal agencies, academia, conservation and other non-governmental groups, and private citizens. The HRI is co-founder of the Tri-national Initiative for Marine Science and Conservation that meets each year in one of the three countries. The HRI worked with people and data from many nations to produce a report Gulf360° State of the Gulf of Mexico, an overview of the natural and social systems in and around the Gulf.

== Gulf of Mexico Summits ==
HRI sponsored several State of the Gulf of Mexico Summit conferences. The first was in 2006.

At the 2011 Summit, the HRI along with partners Harwell Gentile & Associates, LLC and University of Maryland Center for Environmental Science presented a comprehensive "Gulf of Mexico Ecosystem Report Card Prototype" that would provide a scientific, graphical representation of the Gulf's current environmental condition. The Report Card Prototype, which was made available to the highest levels of decision makers, the most knowledgeable and experienced scientific investigators, and the general public, detailed the policies and resources needed to achieve sustainability of a healthy Gulf of Mexico.

At the State of the Gulf of Mexico Summit 2014 held March 24–27 in Houston, Texas, Mexico's National Institute of Statistics and Geography (Instituto Nacional de Estadística y Geografía - INEGI) and Texas A&M-Corpus Christi signed an agreement to cooperate in addressing some of the most complex issues relating to the Gulf. The agreement includes shared research projects, the interchange of findings, and other collaborations on issues ranging from the protection of endangered marine species to offshore drilling and contamination.

The fourth State of the Gulf of Mexico Summit was held on March 26–28, 2017 in Houston, Texas, including representatives from Cuba, Mexico, and the U.S. It was held in conjunction with the Gulf of Mexico Workshop on International Research.

== Center for Sportfish Science and Conservation ==
In fall 2012, The Coastal Conservation Association committed $500,000 for HRI to establish the first research center for the study of sportfish in the western Gulf of Mexico. The Harte Research Support Foundation contributed more than $300,000 to build an offshore research vessel, purchase other supporting equipment such as new vehicles, and other funding. The Center focuses on the many challenges to maintaining healthy populations, both inshore and offshore, to assure the best decisions are made in managing fisheries and the marine environment.

== Research Databases ==
- The HRI GulfBase website is a searchable and sortable database website for all Gulf of Mexico researchers and research institutes. It includes ever-increasing amounts of information on bays and lagoons, reefs and islands and events to help researchers, policy makers, and the general public work together to insure long-term sustainable use and conservation of the Gulf of Mexico.
- The Gulf of Mexico Research Initiative Information and Data Cooperative (GRIIDC) is implementing a research database to receive and process data collected from multiple sources and scientific disciplines in the Gulf of Mexico. GRIIDC will have web services to allow for direct access or machine-to-machine communication to its repository.
- The HRI Gulf of Mexico Ecosystem Services Valuation Database (GecoServ) is a searchable database that gathers ecosystem services (ES) valuation studies relevant to the Gulf of Mexico. GecoServ's two main goals are to allow for the distribution and sharing of information about such studies and to identify current gaps in the ES literature. The studies summarized there are for habitats relevant to the Gulf region even though they may have been conducted elsewhere.
- Freshwater Inflows is an ecosystem-based tool that was created to aid in coastal management decisions regarding freshwater inflow, which is an important component of estuarine health.
