= Western Regional Climate Center =

United States scientific organization

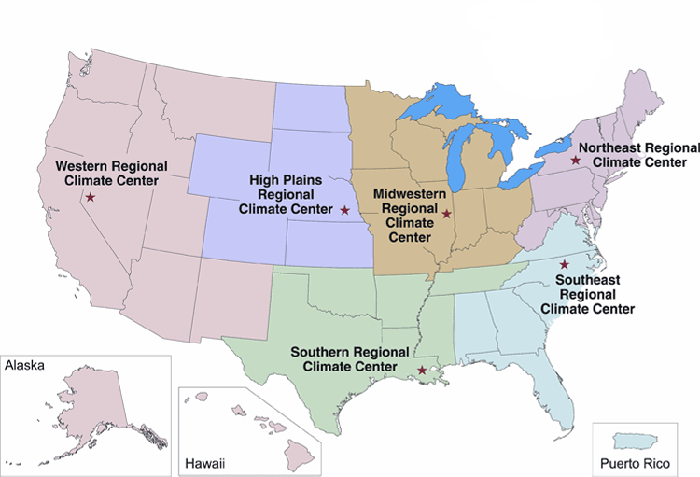
- NCEI Climate Center Locations & Coverage Areas; WRCC and its coverage area highlighted in red
- Abbreviation: WRCC
- Formation: 1986; 40 years ago
- Founded at: Reno, Nevada, U.S.
- Headquarters: Reno, Nevada, U.S.
- Coordinates: 39.5720047°N 119.8034915°W
- Website: https://wrcc.dri.edu/

The Western Regional Climate Center (WRCC) is a climate research center based in Reno, Nevada serving the Western United States (except Colorado and Wyoming). The WRCC is one of six regional centers administered by the National Oceanic and Atmospheric Administration and National Centers for Environmental Information, and partners with the Nevada-based Desert Research Institute (DRI).

The WRCC was established in 1986 through a $760,000 federal grant. The center would be open for entities (i.e. businesses, government agencies, universities, and individuals) to use the "DRI computer system to monitor and analyze weather conditions." In other words, WRCC's team of climatologists would provide data and information for entities that need it.

== See also ==
- Desert Research Institute
- National Climatic Data Center
- National Centers for Environmental Information
- High Plains Regional Climate Center
