= Harry Whittington =

American political figure shot by Dick Cheney (1927–2023)

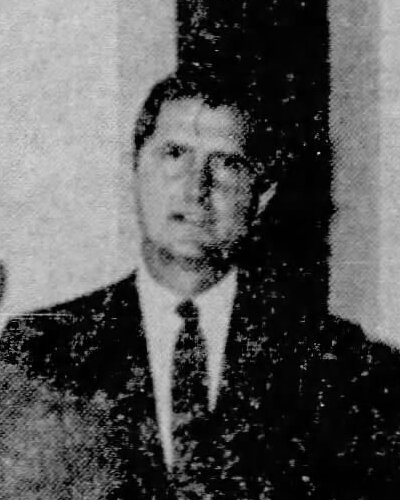
- Whittington in 1968
- Born: Harry Milner Whittington; March 3, 1927; Henderson, Texas, U.S.
- Died: February 4, 2023 (aged 95); Austin, Texas, U.S.
- Education: University of Texas Law School
- Occupations: Lawyer; real estate investor; political figure
- Known for: Dick Cheney hunting accident
- Spouse: Mercedes Baker (m. 1950)
- Children: 4

Harry Milner Whittington (March 3, 1927 – February 4, 2023) was an American lawyer, real estate investor, and political figure. He received international media attention following an incident on February 11, 2006, when he was accidentally shot in the face, neck, and torso by then-United States vice president Dick Cheney while hunting quail with two women on a ranch in Kenedy County, Texas, near Corpus Christi. It was the first time someone had been shot by a sitting United States vice-president since Alexander Hamilton was shot in a duel by Aaron Burr in 1804.

== Early life ==
Harry Milner Whittington was born to Roy and Clara Whittington on March 3, 1927, in Henderson, Texas. He was born in a Democratic family. After attending various local public schools and becoming an Eagle Scout, he attended the University of Texas at Austin in 1944, joining the Phi Delta Theta fraternity. While enrolled in university, he worked in a men's clothing store and as a booking agent for dance bands.

At age 18, during the final months of World War II, he enrolled in the military. He served until the end of the war. Following his time in the military, he resumed his education, graduating from the University of Texas School of Law in 1950.

== Political and government service ==
Whittington is cited as a critical figure behind Texas' shift from being dominated by the Democratic Party to the Republican Party in the latter half of the 20th century. Though his parents were Democrats, Whittington, attracted to the Republican party's ideals of smaller government and lower taxes, aligned himself more with the GOP. After graduating from the University of Texas at Austin, he entered into state Republican circles. He managed John Tower's successful 1961 run for the US Senate in Texas, the first successful Republican bid in the state since Reconstruction. He also accompanied future president George H. W. Bush in his failed 1964 bid to become a US Senator for Texas, and financially backed his son, future president George W. Bush, in his 2000 and 2004 election campaigns.

Over the years, Whittington had been appointed to several committees and commissions, including the Office of Patient Protection Executive Committee (a committee formed by the governor of Texas to ensure the rights of patients), the Texas Public Finance Authority Board, and the Texas Department of Corrections. In the 1980s, as an appointee of Gov. Bill Clements to the Texas Corrections Board, he was instrumental in bringing about reforms necessary for Texas to comply with a federal court order that found the state's treatment of its prisoners unconstitutional. Whittington was named presiding officer of the Texas Funeral Service Commission after a major shakeup of the agency in 1999. He was appointed by then-Texas Governor George W. Bush and re-appointed in 2002 by Governor Rick Perry.

== Legal cases and land dispute ==
In 1959, Whittington challenged Austin's involvement in the controversial Federal Urban Renewal Program which enabled the government to seize the property of low-income residents. Following a city council election, Whittington contested the vote in court and after a ten day trial, the election was deemed void by a judge due to the high number of disqualified votes. In 1984, he also legally contested the city over its attempt to enforce invalid ordinances against various downtown properties he owned.

In 2000, Whittington began fighting a legal case involving the eminent domain seizure of a city block of property he owned in Austin. In 2013, after various court proceedings, a Texas district court awarded the title of the property to the city of Austin and ordered the city to pay Whittington $10,500,000 in compensation for the property, which is now a parking garage for the Austin Convention Center.

== Hunting incident ==
On February 11, 2006, Whittington was accidentally shot by then-United States vice president Dick Cheney during a quail hunting trip, at a ranch in south Texas. Most of the damage from the shotgun blast was to the right side of his body, including damage to his face, neck, and chest, causing a collapsed lung. He was taken to Corpus Christi Memorial Hospital by ambulance and put into intensive care. The accident was not announced in the news media until the White House confirmed the incident to the Corpus Christi Caller-Times approximately 12 hours after the incident.

On February 14, some of the lead birdshot lodged in Whittington's heart caused a minor heart attack. Doctors did not remove all the pellets from Whittington's body. They estimated that there were "less than 150 or 200" pellets lodged in his body immediately after the shooting, and about 30 pieces of shot were expected to remain inside him for the rest of his life. On February 17, Whittington made a public statement: "We all assume certain risks in whatever we do. Whatever activities we pursue and regardless of how experienced, careful and dedicated we are, accidents do and will happen." After being released from the hospital, he issued the following statement: "My family and I are deeply sorry for all that Vice President Cheney and his family have had to go through this week."

Following the incident, Whittington returned to private life and refused many media offers for interviews. In an October 2010 issue of The Washington Post, he broke his silence about the shooting. Whittington told the paper that although many media outlets had described Cheney and him as "good friends", the pair had only met one another three times in 30 years, and had never been hunting before. The Washington Post article also said that Cheney had violated "two basic rules of hunting safety": he failed to ensure that he had a clear shot before firing, and fired without being able to see blue sky beneath his target. The Washington Post also reported that Cheney had still neither publicly nor privately apologized to Whittington for the shooting.

== Personal life and death ==
Whittington married Mercedes Baker in 1950, and they had four daughters. He died at his home in Austin on February 4, 2023, at age 95, from complications of a fall he sustained earlier in the year.
