= NOAA Central Library =

U.S. Atmospheric Administration library

National Oceanic and Atmospheric Administration Library

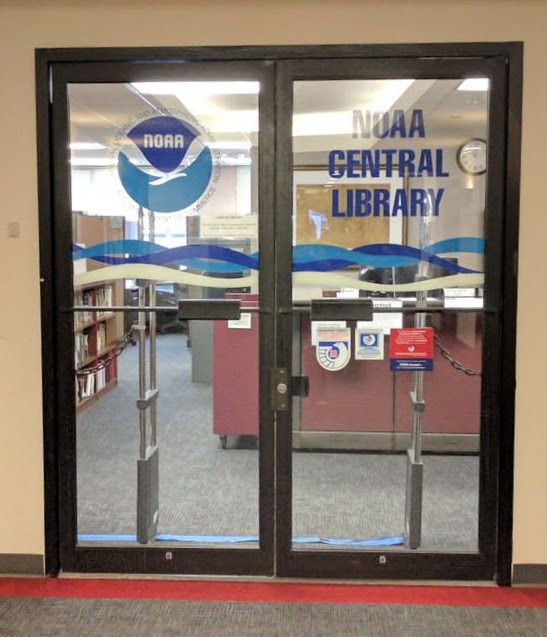
- NOAA Library front doors
- 38.992491267170934°N 77.02982601409487°W
- Location: 1315 East-West Highway; SSMC3 2nd Floor; Silver Spring, Maryland 20910, United States of America
- Type: Government science library
- Established: 1970
- Branch of: Department of Commerce

Access and use
- Access requirements: Members of the public must contact the library in advance to access materials.
- Population served: NOAA employees and affiliates, general public

Other information
- Director: Ben Hope
- Website: http://library.noaa.gov/

The NOAA Library is one of a network of nine libraries serving as the primary information hub for the National Oceanic and Atmospheric Administration (NOAA).

== History ==
In 1970, with the formation of NOAA, the libraries of the National Weather Service, United States Coast and Geodetic Survey, and Bureau of Commercial Fisheries of the United States Fish and Wildlife Service (which became NOAA's National Marine Fisheries Service (NMFS)) merged to become the NOAA Central library.

Part of the NOAA Central library collection is from the former United States Weather Bureau library, itself descended from the United States Signal Corps library.

The library was previously located in Rockville, Maryland just northwest of Old Georgetown Road until 1993, when it moved to its current location in Silver Spring, Maryland. Its website was established in 1995.

== Patrons ==
NOAA employees and affiliates have full access to the library's e-resources and physical holdings. Members of the public can access the library in Silver Spring by arranging their visit in advance.

== Contents ==
The library subscribes to thousands of peer-reviewed journals in print and electronic formats, and maintains the institutional repository containing NOAA's digital publications. It also holds works and artifacts pertaining to the history of NOAA.

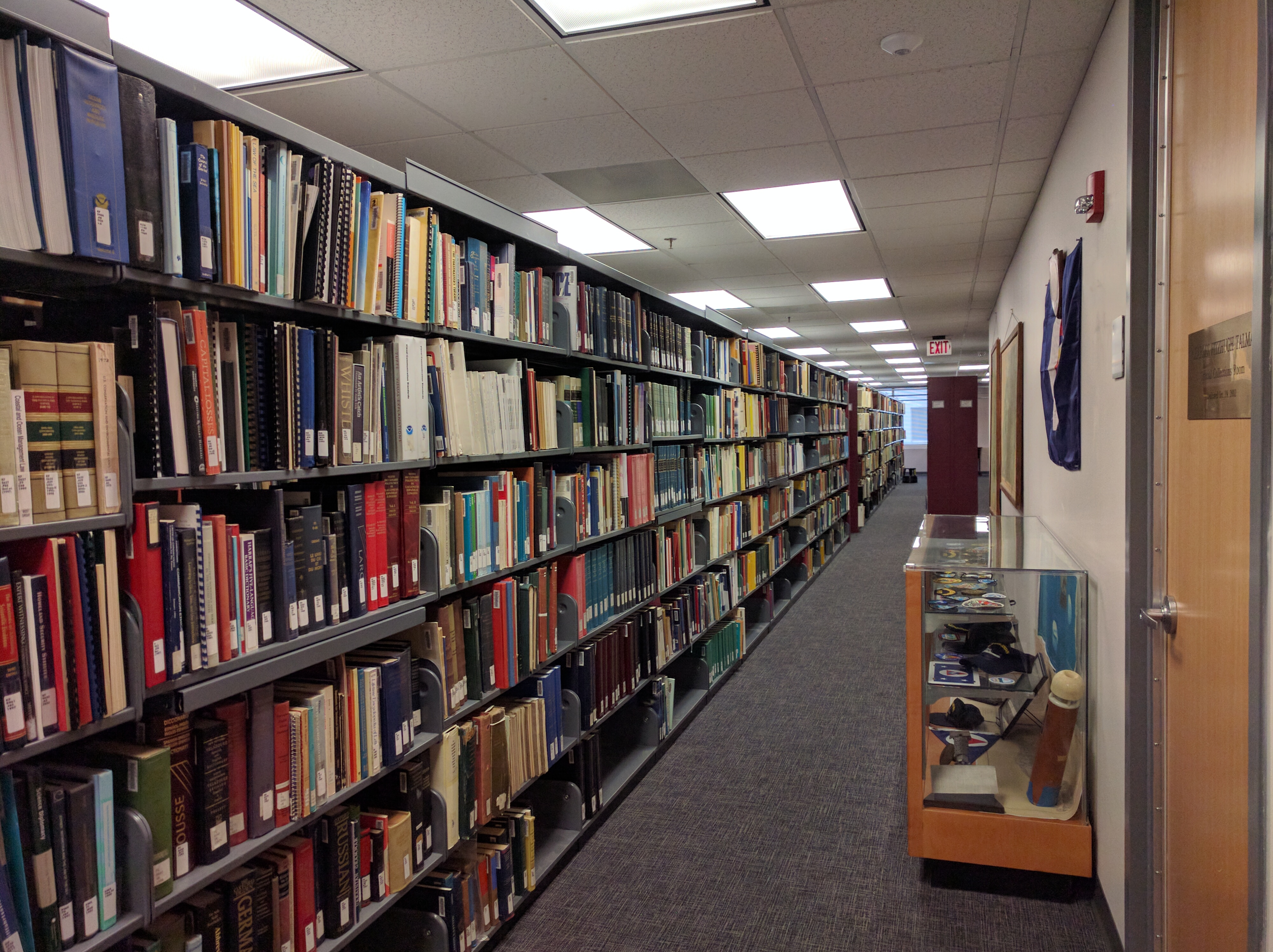
NOAA Central Library stacks

== Role within data digitization ==
The NOAA Library has worked extensively with the National Centers for Environmental Information in Asheville, North Carolina. Projects have included digitizing foreign climate data books, the United States Daily Weather Map series, and Monthly Weather Review articles. Researchers at the library from the Hydrometeorological Prediction Center (HPC, now the Weather Prediction Center or WPC) also digitized the library's microfilm North American and Northern Hemispheric map collections, originally created by the National Meteorological Center (NMC).

== Awards ==
In 1999 the NOAA Library organized over 500 NOAA websites under a single locator and created a significant digital image library of meteorological images from the 1800s to the 1950s, which won the Federal Library and Information Center Committee award.
