= Harte Hanks =

American marketing services company

Harte Hanks, Inc.
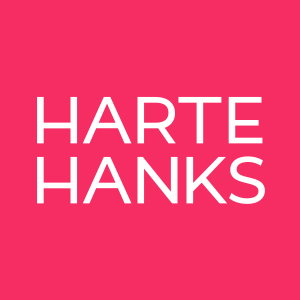
- Company type: Public
- Traded as: Nasdaq: HHS
- Industry: Marketing Services
- Predecessor: Harte-Hanks Newspapers; Harte-Hanks Communications
- Founded: San Antonio, Texas, U.S. (1923)
- Founder: Houston Harte and Bernard Hanks
- Headquarters: 1 Executive Drive, Suite 303; Chelmsford, Massachusetts, United States
- Area served: Worldwide
- Key people: Kirk Davis (CEO, 2023-present)
- Services: Direct and digital marketing
- Number of employees: 2,500
- Website: www.hartehanks.com

Harte Hanks is a global marketing services company headquartered in Boston, Massachusetts. Harte Hanks services include analytics, strategy, marketing technology, creative services, digital marketing, customer care, direct mail, logistics, and fulfillment.

== History ==
Founded by Houston Harte and Bernard Hanks in 1923 as Harte-Hanks Newspapers (and later Harte-Hanks Communications), the company spent its first 50 years operating newspapers in Texas. In 1968, the company relocated from Abilene to San Antonio. It made its first IPO on March 8, 1972, later diversifying into television and radio properties. In 1984, the company's managers took it private, later going public again in 1993. In the mid-1990s, the company withdrew from the newspaper and broadcasting business and focused solely on direct marketing and shopper publications.

=== Newspapers ===
Harte Hanks' first newspapers were Hanks' Abilene Reporter-News and Harte's San Angelo Standard. Other early acquisitions in the 1920s and 1930s included the Harlingen Star, Corpus Christi Times, Big Spring Herald, and Paris News. The company incorporated as Harte-Hanks Newspapers, Inc. in 1948.

The company bought two competing newspapers in Greenville, Texas, in the mid-1950s, consolidating them into the Herald-Banner after two years of fierce rivalry. A court case followed, with Harte Hanks accused of unfair competition. The chain was acquitted of the charges in 1959.

In 1962, the company took full ownership of San Antonio Express-News, its largest-circulation newspaper. The Express-News was one of the first properties Harte Hanks sold off, however, as it began to narrow its focus to smaller newspapers and eventually to direct marketing. Rupert Murdoch paid $19 million for the Express-News in 1973.

At the time of the first initial public offering in 1972, the firm owned properties in 19 markets across six states. The paper expanded outside of Texas that year with the purchase of the Anderson Independent and Anderson Daily Mail of Anderson, South Carolina, merging them into the Anderson Independent-Mail.

By 1980, the company owned 29 daily and 68 weekly newspapers.

In 1995, Harte Hanks sold to Community Newspaper Company its interest in the Massachusetts-based Middlesex News, two other dailies, and associated weeklies in the western suburbs of Boston. It had owned the News since 1972 and bought the News-Tribune and Daily Transcript in 1986.

The Abilene, Anderson, Corpus Christi, and San Angelo papers, among the last remaining Harte Hanks newspaper properties, were sold to E. W. Scripps Company in May 1997. Scripps spun off its newspaper assets into the Journal Media Group in April 2015. Journal was then absorbed into Gannett in April 2016.

=== Television and radio ===
The company made its first foray into other media as early as 1962, when Harte Hanks bought KENS-AM-TV, San Antonio's CBS radio and television affiliates, as part of its acquisition of the Express-News. Harte Hanks turned KENS from a perennial ratings also-ran to the market leader by 1968. In the 1970s, the newspaper-dominated company further diversified its holdings by purchasing the WAIM radio and TV stations in Anderson as part of its purchase of the Independent and Mail, as well as television stations in Jacksonville, Florida, Greensboro, North Carolina, and Springfield, Missouri. In 1978, Harte Hanks bought radio stations formerly owned by Southern Broadcasting. In 1980, the company's broadcast holdings were four television stations, 11 radio stations, and four cable television systems. It sold off most of these assets in the mid-1980s to pay down debt incurred in the leveraged buyout that took the company private. Harte Hanks continued to hold KENS until 1997, when the company's remaining newspaper properties and it were sold to Scripps.

==== Television stations ====
Media market	State	Station	Purchased	Sold	Notes
Jacksonville	Florida	WTLV	1975	1988	
Springfield–Branson	Missouri	KYTV	1978	1987	
Greensboro–High Point–Winston-Salem	North Carolina	WFMY-TV	1976	1988	
Greensboro–High Point–Winston-Salem	North Carolina	WGHP	1978		
Anderson–Greenville–Spartanburg	South Carolina	WAIM-TV	1972	1978	
San Antonio	Texas	KENS-TV	1962	1997	

=== Other businesses ===
Harte Hanks was formerly associated with the publication of weekly shopper publications, with a circulation at one time of 13 million weekly in 1,100 separate editions of The PennySaver and The Flyer in California and Florida, respectively. The company sold The Flyer to Coda Media in 2012, having owned it since 1983. The PennySaver and website PennySaverUSA.com, a nationwide network of local advertising content online for consumers and businesses, were sold to OpenGate Capital in 2013. Harte Hanks had owned the publication since 1972.

In 2006, Harte Hanks acquired Global Address, a software company based in the United Kingdom that developed international address-validation technology. In 2008, Global Address was renamed to Trillium Software, which was later sold to Syncsort in 2016.

In 2008, Harte Hanks acquired Mason Zimbler, a UK-based digital marketing and media provider.

In 2008, Harte Hanks acquired Strange & Dawson, a UK-based digital advertising service.

In 2010, Harte Hanks acquired Information Arts, a UK-based data insight, data management, and database-marketing firm.

In 2015, Harte Hanks acquired San Mateo, California-based digital marketing firm 3Q Digital. In 2018, Harte Hanks sold 3Q back to an entity owned by previous 3Q Digital owners.
