= Houston Harte =

American newspaper publisher (1893–1972)

Robert William Houston Harte was a newspaperman who co-founded Harte-Hanks Communications.

Harte was born January 12, 1893, in Knob Noster, Missouri. After a year at the University of California, Harte returned to the University of Missouri, where he received his degree in journalism in 1915.

== Journalism ==
Harte went to work as business manager for the Missouri Republican and was then its editor and publisher until 1920.

Hanks' first newspaper acquisitions were the Abilene Reporter-News and the San Angelo Standard. During the 1920s and '30s, he continued to acquire other newspapers, including the Corpus Christi Times . Harte-Hanks Newspapers was created in 1948.

At the time of his death, in 1972, the company owned a television station and 19 newspapers across six states.

== Other activities ==
While leading his first newspaper, Harte also served as a captain during World War I (1918-1919).

Harte created the book In Our Image along with Time illustrator, Guy Rowe, a collection of Bible stories published in 1949 by Oxford University Press. For that book, the two men won a Christopher Award.

Harte was instrumental in preserving historic Fort Concho in San Angelo. He also donated substantially to Angelo State University, and served on the board of directors for Texas Technological College (now Texas Tech University).

Harte was also a confidante of U.S. President Lyndon B. Johnson. His association with Johnson led him to end his longstanding friendship with a leading Johnson critic, historian J. Evetts Haley.

Harte married Caroline Isabel McCutcheon in 1921. Their two sons, Edward H. Harte and Houston H. Harte, also became prominent newspaper publishers. Harte died March 1972 in San Angelo, Texas.
