= Corpus Christi Memorial Hospital =

Christus Spohn Hospital Corpus Christi - Memorial
- Christus Spohn Health System

Geography
- Location: Corpus Christi, Texas, United States
- Coordinates: 27.7799°N 97.4162°W

Organization
- Religious affiliation: Catholic
- Network: Christus Health

History
- Opened: May 1944
- Closed: September 2022
- Demolished: April 2023

Links
- Lists: Hospitals in Texas

Christus Spohn Hospital Corpus Christi - Memorial (formerly known as Corpus Christi Memorial Hospital) was a 465-bed hospital in Corpus Christi, Texas, that was part of the Christus Spohn Health System, operated by Christus Health. It ceased all operations in September 2022, and was demolished in April 2023.

== History ==
Corpus Christi Memorial Hospital originally opened in May 1944 and was run by Nueces County. The Spohn Healthcare system acquired Memorial Hospital from Nueces County in 1996. The Spohn system, including Spohn Memorial were acquired by the Christus Health system in 1998, and Memorial hospital became Christus Spohn Corpus Christi - Memorial Hospital. It obtained level II trauma certification in 2007, and became the major trauma center for Corpus Christi and the surrounding area at that time. It remained the major trauma center for the city until May 2017, when trauma services were transferred to Christus Spohn Hospital Corpus Christi - Shoreline as part of the Our PATH initiative.

A family residency medicine program was established at Memorial in 1973 and an emergency medicine residency program was established in 2007 by the Texas A&M College of Medicine; both programs were transferred to Christus Spohn Shoreline as part of the "Our PATH" initiative.

The hospital was awarded the Distinguished Hospital Award for Clinical Excellence by HealthGrades, an independent health-care quality organization that selects the top 5% of hospitals nationwide for that award.

=== Our PATH and closure of Memorial Hospital ===
In May 2014, Christus Spohn administration announced its "Our PATH" initiative to reorganize the Spohn healthcare system. The initiative included the construction of a new patient care tower and emergency department at sister hospital Christus Spohn Shoreline, the construction of the Hector P. Garcia (HPG) Memorial Family Health Center adjacent to Spohn Memorial, and the closure of Spohn Memorial Hospital. Services from Spohn Memorial would be transferred to two other hospitals in the Spohn system: Spohn Shoreline, which would become the major trauma center for Corpus Christi, and Spohn South, which had already received Memorial's labor and delivery services in 2011.

In May 2017, with construction underway for the Shoreline expansion and the HPG Clinic opened in January, services began shutting down at Memorial. The level II trauma designation was transferred to Spohn Shoreline on May 1, 2017, and Memorial stopped admitting patients to wards. By the end of 2017, the only admitting beds open at Memorial were for psychiatric patients. The 10-bed emergency department remained open, though all medical patients requiring admission were transferred to other facilities.

In August 2017, the hospital was damaged by water from Hurricane Harvey, temporarily shutting down the emergency department and behavioral health services that were still open at the time.

The Nueces County Hospital District voted in October 2018 to sell the hospital and surrounding land, excluding the HPG Clinic, under the condition that the purchaser destroys the hospital building; no buyer has been announced.

=== Final closure of services and demolition ===
On October 1, 2019, the emergency department closed all services and completed the transfer of emergency services to Christus Spohn Shoreline. This only left the behavioral health services run in conjunction with Nueces County. In June 2020, Christus Spohn announced a new partnership with behavioral healthcare system Oceans Healthcare; Oceans took over operations of the two inpatient psychiatric units and psychiatric evaluation service still in place at Memorial. In September 2022, Oceans Healthcare opened its newest facility, Oceans Behavioral Hospital - Corpus Christi, inside of Christus Spohn Shoreline, and ceased all operations at Memorial.

The hospital remained vacant for the rest of its time. On October 17, 2022, the hospital and grounds were blessed before demolition began. Demolition of Christus Spohn Memorial was completed in April 2023. While Nueces County officials have stated that the grounds will always be reserved for healthcare-related pursuits, no plans have officially been announced for the space.

== Notable patients ==
- Selena Quintanilla-Pérez was brought to Memorial Hospital after being shot in 1995; she was pronounced dead at Memorial.
- Harry Whittington recovered at Spohn Memorial during the Dick Cheney hunting accident in 2006.
