= High Plains Regional Climate Center =

US regional climate center

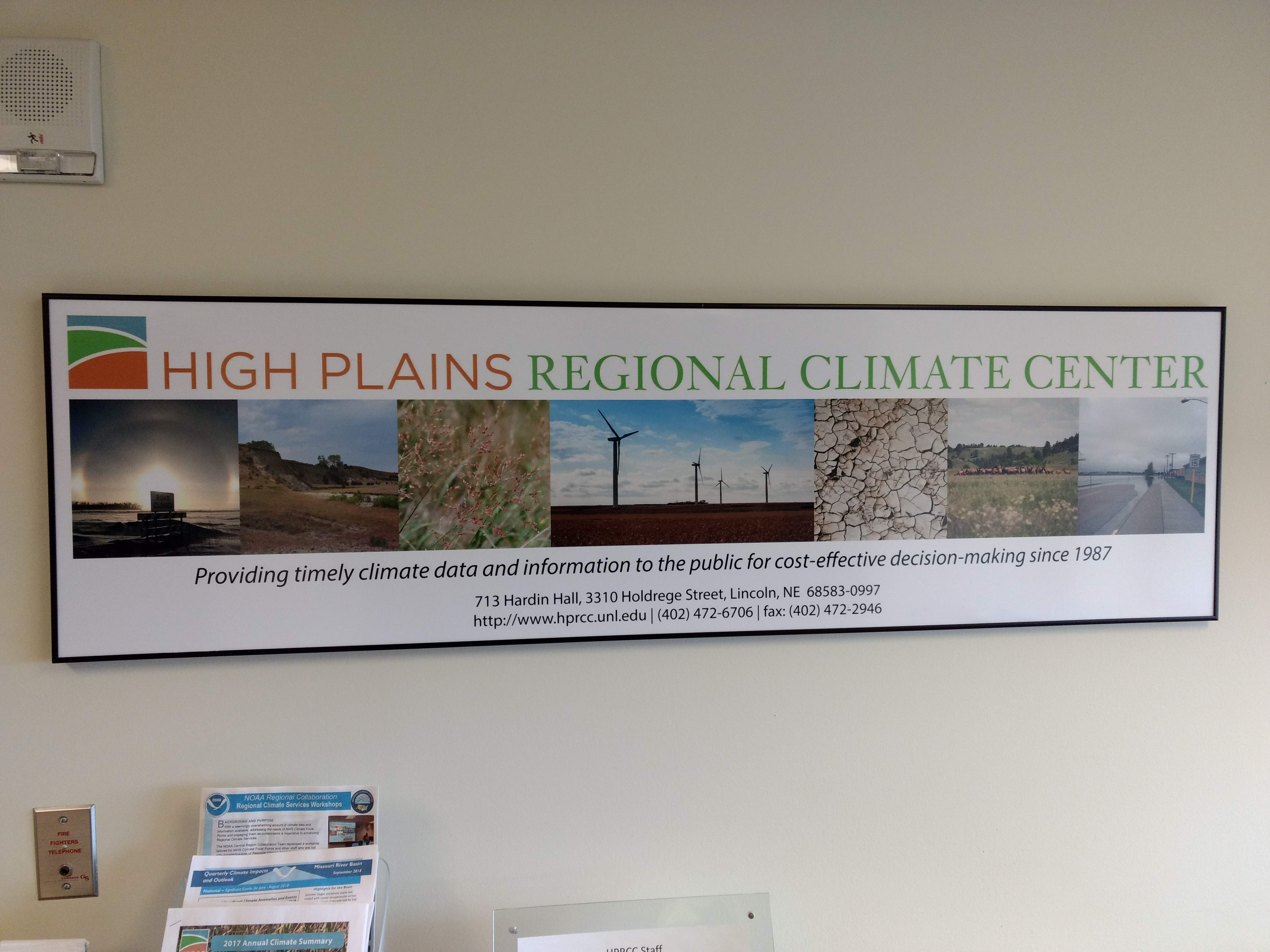

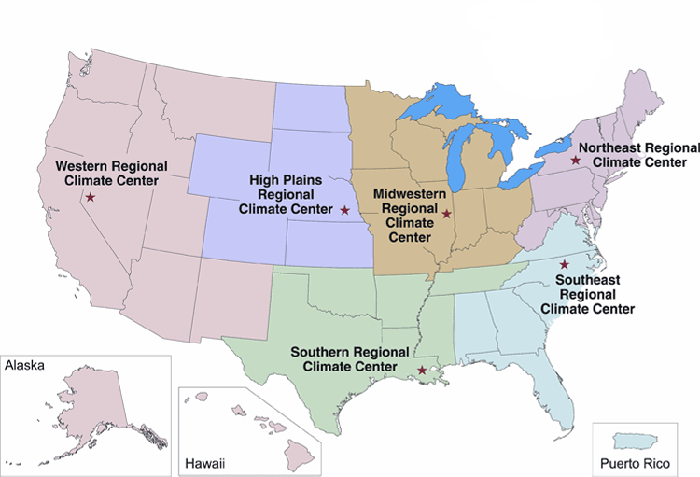
- Abbreviation: HPRCC
- Predecessor: High Plains Climate Center
- Formation: 1987
- Headquarters: Lincoln, Nebraska
- Parent organization: University of Nebraska–Lincoln
- Affiliations: National Centers for Environmental Information
- Website: hprcc.unl.edu

The High Plains Regional Climate Center (HPRCC) is one of the six regional climate centers in the United States. It is managed by the National Centers for Environmental Information, and operated by the University of Nebraska–Lincoln's College of Agricultural Sciences and Natural Resources.

The HPRCC provides climate products and services to the High Plains Region, comprising Colorado, Kansas, Nebraska, North Dakota, South Dakota and Wyoming.

== Climate summary maps ==
HPRCC is the daily producer of the Applied Climate Information System (ACIS) climate summary maps.

== Automated Weather Data Network ==
HPRCC, along with Colorado, Iowa, Kansas, Nebraska, North Dakota and Wyoming, uses the Automated Weather Data Network to provide information to agricultural producers.
