= Northern Gulf Institute =

The Northern Gulf Institute (NGI) is a National Oceanic and Atmospheric Administration (NOAA) Cooperative Institute started in October 2006. It is one of 20 NOAA Cooperative Institutes (CIs). The NGI is a partnership of six academic institutions and NOAA. The collaboration led by Mississippi State University (MSU), includes the University of Southern Mississippi (USM), Louisiana State University (LSU), Florida State University (FSU), the University of Alabama in Huntsville, and the Dauphin Island Sea Lab (DISL). The NGI defines the Northern Gulf of Mexico region as the upland, watershed, coastal zone, and coastal ocean areas from the Sabine River in Louisiana east to the Suwannee River in Florida.

== History ==
The Northern Gulf Institute (NGI) is a National Oceanic and Atmospheric Administration (NOAA) Cooperative Institute developed within the context of the Memorandum of Agreement between Mississippi State University (MSU) and NOAA. The collaboration led by Mississippi State University (MSU), includes the University of Southern Mississippi (USM), Louisiana State University (LSU), Florida State University (FSU), and the Dauphin Island Sea Lab (DISL). The NGI also has Memorandum of Agreements with several regional entities who share interests in the Gulf of Mexico including the Mississippi-Alabama Sea Grant Consortium, the Harte Research Institute, the Gulf of Mexico Coastal Ocean Observing System Regional Association, and the Mississippi Department of Marine Resources.

The NGI defines the Northern Gulf of Mexico region as the upland, watershed, coastal zone, and coastal ocean areas the Sabine River in Louisiana east to the Suwannee River in Florida. This region is a rich and interdependent natural environment of great complexity vital to the Nation. The riverine-dominated Northern Gulf ecosystems are under pressure from increasing population and coastal development, impacts from severe storms and climate variability, inland watershed and coastal wetlands degradation, and many other factors. This is the geographic focus for the NGI.

Recognizing the need to integrate research and technology to more effectively address the needs of the Northern Gulf of Mexico, NOAA’s Office of Oceanic and Atmospheric Research (OAR) issued an Announcement of Federal Funding Opportunity (OAR-CIPO-2006-2000641) on April 26, 2006. NOAA evaluated and awarded the Northern Gulf Institute Cooperative Institute to the team led by Mississippi State University on October 1, 2006. The award is part of the Cooperative Institute Program furthering regional and national interests in the Northern Gulf of Mexico. The institute is consistent with and expands upon the Memorandum of Agreement between MSU and NOAA, the NOAA notice of award to MSU of October 1, 2006, and the NOAA Cooperative Institute Interim Handbook. NGI’s approach to Northern Gulf Regional issues and opportunities is closely aligned with NOAA’s strategic and research priorities. The NGI is also guided in its mission by a number of sources, the White House’s Ocean Action Plan and the 2004 coordinated and comprehensive report of the congressional United States Commission on Ocean Policy, the Gulf of Mexico Alliance, and others. The result is an approach that is science driven, regionally focused, and coordinated with other Gulf of Mexico Basin activities. NOAA awarded NGI a second five-year term in 2011, after a NOAA Science Advisory Board review rated NGI as outstanding.

== Vision ==
The NGI seeks research-driven transformations in regional ecosystem-based management enable managers and communities to improve the resilience and health of ecosystems and people and the sustainability of resources in the northern Gulf of Mexico.

== Mission ==
The NGI conducts research that builds an integrated, comprehensive understanding of natural and human impacts on northern Gulf of Mexico ecosystems and economies to improve its management.

== Research themes and goals ==
The NGI focuses on four research themes that align with NOAA’s research and operational focuses. These themes provide a framework for the activities of the institute. The four NGI research themes are:

1. Ecosystem-based management
2. Geospatial data/information and visualization in environmental science
3. Climate change and climate variability effects on regional ecosystems
4. Coastal hazards and resiliency

The NGI has three research goals and two engagement goals. The three research goals are:

1. Understand the structure, function, and services of ecosystems across land-sea, ocean-atmosphere, and coastal waters-deep sea interfaces
2. Synthesize information across disciplines to reduce uncertainty and to forecast ecosystem responses
3. Develop applications that address regional management needs

The two engagement goals are:

1. Develop, facilitate, disseminate, and transition research, knowledge, and applications
2. Build internal and external connections for institutional sustainability
