= San Angelo Standard-Times =

Newspaper in San Angelo, Texas

- Type: Daily newspaper
- Format: Broadsheet
- Owner: USA Today Co.
- Publisher: Jeff DeLoach
- Editor: Michael Paul Harris
- Founded: 1884
- Headquarters: 34 W Harris Ave; San Angelo, TX 76903; United States
- Circulation: 4,143 (as of 2023)
- Website: gosanangelo.com

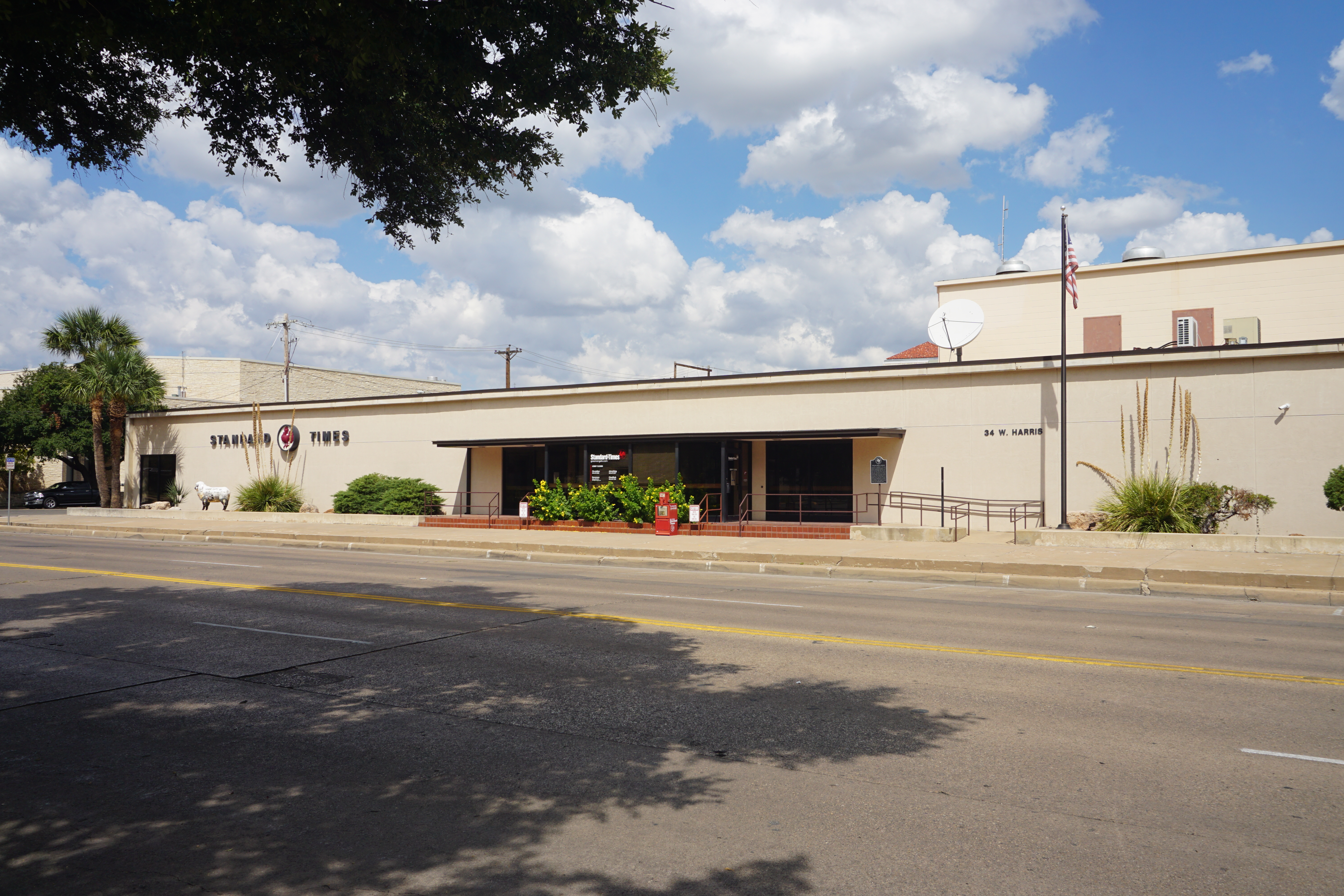
San Angelo Standard-Times building

San Angelo Standard-Times is a daily newspaper based in San Angelo, Texas, United States that was established in 1884. It is owned by USA Today Co.

== History ==
The newspaper was established in 1884 by J. G. Murphy, the city's second mayor. Mr. Murphy sold the paper in the 1920s to Houston Harte. In 1924, it became one of the two original flagships of the Harte-Hanks newspaper chain.

The San Angelo Standard-Times building was constructed in 1951, providing 38,000 square feet on two floors. In 1984, a rehabilitation project added another 10,000 square feet.

Scripps began operating the newspaper in 1997 after purchasing it from Harte-Hanks, and as of 2015, Scripps operated this newspaper through its subsidiary Journal Media Group. The newspaper and its reporters have won various journalism awards, including awards from the Associated Press of Texas, presented in 2015.

The newspaper moved to a six day printing schedule like other Gannett owned newspapers, eliminating its printed Saturday edition.

== Alumni ==
Western novelist Elmer Kelton began his career in 1948 as the farm-and-ranch editor at the Standard-Times.
