= Quail hunting =

Hunting of quail

Quail hunting is a hunting sport. There are 21 subspecies of northern bobwhite, a ground-dwelling bird native to the United States, Mexico, and the Caribbean. Many of the common larger species are hunted as game birds.

== History ==
The archaeological record from excavations of indigenous peoples' sites in North America reveal few quail bones, suggesting that those early inhabitants focused on larger game that may have produced greater results for the effort involved. When European settlers arrived, quail hunting began in earnest.

== Modern developments ==
Quail live throughout the United States. Quail hunting in the 20th century was the most popular game hunting sport. Due to their popularity as game birds and their extensive distribution, quail have been studied throughout the North American continent, particularly in the 20th century. In the twenty years from the late 1960s through the late 1980s, quail populations, as measured by hunting statistics, showed dramatic declines. Causes included disease, habitat reduction, hunting, weather variables and other impacts. These were addressed through formation of organizations such as Quail Unlimited and through side benefits from the 1981 Farm Act, which encouraged farmers to remove highly eroded land from cultivation, thus increasing quail habitat.

== See also ==
- Dick Cheney hunting accident, which occurred during a quail hunt.

== Bibliography ==
- A. Starker Leopold (1985). The California Quail. University of California Press. ISBN 9780520907775.
- Hines Lambert (2013). Hunting Quail and Pheasants. The Rosen Publishing Group. ISBN 9781448899036.
- Leonard A. Brennan (2007). Texas Quails: Ecology and Management. Texas A&M University Press. ISBN 9781585445035.
- Richard Rankin, Jr. 2017. While there were still wild birds: A personal history of Southern quail hunting. Macon, GA: Mercer University Press.
