= Dick Cheney hunting accident =

Accidental shooting involving Dick Cheney in 2006

Shooting of Harry Whittington
- Location: Riviera, Texas, U.S.
- Date: February 11, 2006; 20 years ago
- Attack type: Accidental shooting
- Weapon: 28-gauge Perazzi shotgun
- Victim: Harry Whittington (survived)
- Perpetrator: Dick Cheney

On February 11, 2006, then-United States vice president Dick Cheney shot Harry Whittington, a then-78-year-old Texas attorney, with a 28-gauge Perazzi shotgun while participating in a quail hunt on a ranch in Riviera, Texas. Both Cheney and Whittington called the event an accident.

The incident was reported to the Corpus Christi Caller-Times on February 12, 2006, by ranch owner Katherine Armstrong. The Bush administration disclosed the shooting incident to the public the afternoon of February 12. Local authorities released a report on the shooting on February 16, 2006, and witness statements on February 22.

On February 14, 2006, Whittington suffered a non-fatal heart attack and atrial fibrillation due to at least one lead shot lodged in or near his heart. He also had a collapsed lung. Cheney did not speak publicly about the incident until February 15 in an interview with Fox News. Early reports indicated that Cheney and Whittington were friends and that the injuries were minor. Whittington later clarified that he and Cheney were not close friends but had an amicable relationship.

== Shooting incident ==
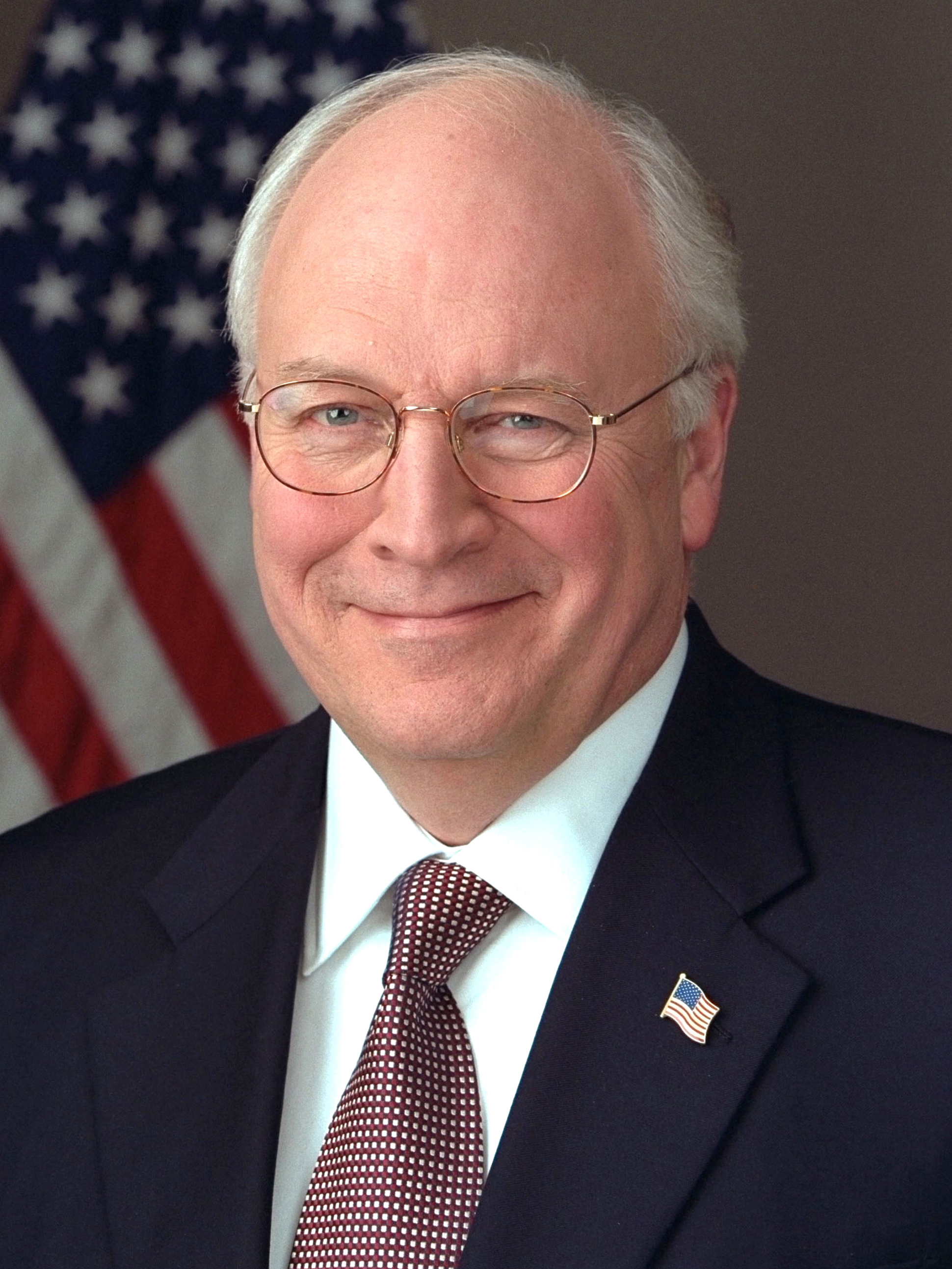
Dick Cheney

=== Day of shooting ===
The shooting was widely reported to have taken place on Saturday, February 11, 2006, based on the public statements of Katherine Armstrong, owner of the 50,000-acre (200 km^{2}) Armstrong Ranch it occurred on. However, in her statement to the Sheriff, she said the shooting happened on February 12. Harry Whittington said shortly after the incident, "Accidents do and will happen—and that's what happened last Friday [February 10]."

=== Time of shooting ===
Mary Matalin stated on Meet the Press that "Somebody had talked to some ranch hand". Neither the Sheriff's report nor witness statements identify who this first reporter was.

The Secret Service said that they gave notice to the Sheriff about one hour after the shooting. Kenedy County Sheriff Ramone Salinas III states he first heard of the shooting at about 5:30 p.m. from Captain Charles Kirk, and Salinas implies that he received 'official' notice from the Secret Service at about 5:40 p.m.

The time of the shooting was not stated by Cheney.

=== The events ===
Cheney had a televised interview about the shooting on February 15. On February 22, the Sheriff's office released statements from Katherine Armstrong, Sarita Hixon, Pamela Pitzer Willeford, Oscar Medellin, Gerardo Medellin, and Andrew Hubert.

Cheney's statement and those of all six other hunting party members specify that Cheney, Whittington, and Willeford had shot at a covey of birds. While Whittington was searching for a downed bird, Cheney, Willeford, and a guide walked towards another covey about 100 yards (91 m) away. Whittington approached within 30 or 40 yards (27 or 37 m) of the shooters, at which point a single bird flew up, around, and behind Cheney in the direction of Whittington. Cheney shot at the bird and hit Whittington.

Armstrong, the ranch owner, claimed that all in the hunting party were wearing blaze-orange safety gear and none had been drinking, and that at lunch they drank beer, which is slightly contradictory to her later statement that "there may (have been) a beer or two in [the lunch coolers], but remember not everyone in the party was shooting." Cheney has acknowledged that he had one beer four or five hours prior to the shooting. Armstrong said she never saw Cheney or Whittington drink until later at the house, where Cheney had a few cocktails. Armstrong did not actually see the incident happen, believing that the reason Cheney's security detail was running was that Cheney had a heart problem, but Cheney described her as an eyewitness in his Fox interview.

Secret Service agents and medical aides, who were traveling with Cheney, came to Whittington's assistance and treated his birdshot wounds to his right cheek, neck, and chest. An ambulance standing nearby for the Vice President took Whittington to close by Kingsville before he was flown by helicopter to Corpus Christi Memorial Hospital in Corpus Christi.

=== People present ===
At the scene:

- Dick Cheney (shooter)
- Harry Whittington (victim)
- Pamela Pitzer Willeford (eyewitness)
- Oscar Medellin (outrider, between Cheney and Willeford, flushed the bird)
- "Secret Service personnel" were reported to be with the two shooters and Oscar Medellin

In a car at an unstated distance away from the shooting:

- Katherine Armstrong, owner of the ranch
- Sarita Storey Armstrong Hixon, Armstrong's sister

=== Texas Parks and Wildlife Department report ===
On February 13, 2006, the Texas Parks and Wildlife Department (an agency once headed by Armstrong) issued an incident report. According to the report, Cheney "was swinging on game" (i.e. turning to track it with his shotgun). The summary of the incident given was:

Whittington downed a bird and went to retrieve it. While he was out of the hunting line, another covey was flushed and Cheney swung on a bird and fired, striking Whittington in the face, neck, and chest.

The report cited clear and sunny weather at the time of the shooting.

== Whittington's injuries ==
Whittington was injured in the face, neck, and upper torso. Whittington was reported to be in stable condition at Corpus Christi Memorial Hospital and had been moved from intensive care to a "step-down unit" on Monday. Doctors decided to leave about 30 birdshot pellets lodged in his body rather than try to remove them. Each pellet was less than 2.5 mm (0.098 in) in diameter.

On February 14, 2006, at 6:30 a.m., Whittington suffered a minor heart attack and atrial fibrillation due to the shot pellets lodged in or near his heart, as well as a collapsed lung. He was immediately moved back to the intensive care unit. At about 9 a.m., Whittington underwent a cardiac catheterization test to detect blocked or leaky arteries. From the test, doctors found a single lead pellet.

Hospital officials said Whittington was alert and stable and that he did not experience chest pain or other symptoms of a heart attack. Doctors reported signs of inflammation, and Whittington was treated with anti-inflammatory drugs.

Whittington was subsequently discharged from the hospital on February 17, 2006. At a press conference, he said: "My family and I are deeply sorry for everything Vice President Cheney and his family have had to deal with. We hope that he will continue to come to Texas and seek the relaxation that he deserves."

In a 2010 interview with The Washington Post, when asked if Cheney had apologized, Whittington declined to answer.

== Information release ==
Though the shooting occurred on Saturday, February 11, news of it was not released until after 2:00 p.m. (Eastern Standard Time) on Sunday, February 12. Kathryn Garcia, a reporter for the Corpus Christi Caller-Times, broke the story at 1:48 p.m. after receiving an 11:00 a.m. call from Katherine Armstrong, the owner of the ranch where the shooting occurred. Armstrong had notified Cheney earlier in the morning that she would inform the news media about the incident. She said Cheney agreed. Armstrong said that Whittington did not announce his location, and this led to the incident.

According to White House Press secretary Scott McClellan, news at the White House about the shooting "... was coming in to people back here, all the way at 3:00 a.m. [Sunday] and beyond." McClellan would not state when the President first learned that Cheney had shot Whittington. When McClellan was asked if Andy Card had told Karl Rove that Cheney was the shooter, McClellan said: "... we still didn't have all the details at that point and additional details were coming into Andy Card at even three [...] in the morning and beyond."

The White House did not disclose the accident until a press conference on Sunday afternoon. McClellan said he did not know Cheney had shot someone until that Sunday morning. He remarked that he did ask the Vice President's office to release the information earlier. He said: "I think you can always look back at these issues and look at how to do a better job."

On February 15, Cheney agreed to comment publicly about the accident on the Fox News Channel. He had previously avoided reporters by leaving an Oval Office meeting with United Nations Secretary-General Kofi Annan. Cheney visited Whittington in the hospital on Monday, February 13, and at other times, telephoned him.

In the Fox News interview, Cheney accepted full responsibility for the accident.

Cheney acknowledged that White House Counselor Dan Bartlett and Scott McClellan "urged us to get the story out". Cheney said he was more concerned about accuracy and felt that Armstrong was the best person to make the announcement.

== Investigations ==
Secret Service spokesman Eric Zahren said that about an hour after Whittington was shot, the head of the Secret Service's local office called the Kenedy County sheriff to report the accident. Kenedy County Sheriff Ramon Salinas III receiving a call of 'official' notice from the Secret Service 8–10 minutes after a Saturday, February 11, 5:30 p.m. phone call from Captain Charles Kirk.

Kirk had called Salinas en route to the Armstrong Ranch to investigate a possible hunting accident. The ensuing official investigation was performed by the Kenedy County Sheriff's department and published in an Incident Report written by Chief Deputy Gilberto San Miguel Jr, a Supplement Report written by Salinas, and several witness statements.

After Salinas finished his call with the Secret Service, Kirk called Salinas again to report that he couldn't get any information about the shooting at the Armstrong gate. Salinas told Kirk: "that it was fine and I [Salinas] would contact someone at the Ranch". Multiple news sources reported that local law enforcement officers were initially barred by United States Secret Service agents from interviewing Cheney.

After dismissing Kirk, Salinas called Constable Ramiro Medellin Jr to ask for information about the accident. None of the police reports say why Salinas thought to call Medellin or where Salinas thought Medellin was. In that first call to Medellin, Salinas reports Medellin saying only he would call Salinas back. Medellin called Salinas back and said that "This is in fact a hunting accident" and that he [Medellin] had spoken with some of the people in the hunting party who were eyewitnesses and that they all said that it was definitely a hunting accident. Salinas says he [Salinas] also spoke with another [unnamed] eyewitness and he[the witness] said the same thing, that it was an accident. Salinas states in his report: "After hearing the same information from eyewitness and Constable Medellin, it was at this time I decided to send my Chief Deputy first thing Sunday morning to interview the Vice-President and other witnesses."

On Sunday morning, Kenedy County Chief Deputy Gilbert San Miguel Jr. interviewed Cheney and other members of the hunting party. He said that Cheney characterized the incident as a "hunting accident".

On Monday, Miguel and Lt. Juan J Guzman went to Spohn Memorial Hospital to interview Whittington. Whittington requested not to be recorded 'due to his voice being raspy' but agreed to supply a written affidavit as soon as he returned home to his office. Whittington characterized the incident as an accident and said no alcohol was involved and that everyone was wearing proper hunting attire. Whittington described shooting at the first covey of quails, searching for a bird, then being sent by Katharine [Armstrong] to shoot the second covey. At that point, "a nurse came into the room and asked Guzman and Salinas to hurry up so Whitington could rest". The officers then left, telling Whittington, "I [Miguel] would give him a call in a few days to get the written affidavit". There is no public record of the promised affidavit being taken or released.

The Kenedy County Sheriff, Ramon Salinas III, cleared Cheney of any criminal wrongdoing.

Bush appointed Katharine Armstrong, a commission member of the Texas Parks and Wildlife Department. Steve Hall, education director for the Texas Parks and Wildlife Department, said that the department would classify the shooting as an error in judgment by Cheney.

The news of the shooting was not released to the press for 21 hours until 1:48 p.m. (07:48) Sunday, February 12. Kathryn Garcia, a reporter for the Corpus Christi Caller-Times, broke the story after receiving a call from Armstrong at 11:00 a.m., after confirming it with the White House and hospital.

A top Republican close to the White House said to Time magazine, "This is either a cover-up story or an incompetence story."

== Controversial points ==
Questions have been raised regarding the shooting, even as Kenedy County Sheriff's Office documents support the official story by Cheney and his party.

Re-creations of the incident were enacted by George Gongora and John Metz, a photographer and producer respectively for the Corpus Christi Caller-Times. The tests proved that the distance was much closer than the 90 feet (27 m) claimed. Local quail hunters have also argued that the range was closer, while others, such as forensic expert Jon Nordby, confirm the plausibility of the official reports.

The time of the shooting was estimated by Cheney and the other members of the hunting party to be variously between 5:30 p.m. and 6:00 p.m. In the Kenedy County Sheriff's Report, Officer Ramone Salinas III states that he first heard the news of the shooting from a Captain Charles Kirk at about 5:30 p.m. Kirk had heard of the shooting prior to that phone call. In Salinas's statement, Salinas says he received official notice from the Secret Service 8 – 10 minutes after the 5:30 p.m. phone call. The Secret Service is reported to have said that they gave notice to the Sheriff about one hour after the shooting, which would put the time of the shooting at approximately 4:40 p.m., 50 – 80 minutes before the entire hunting party's recollection.

== Legacy ==
For years afterward, editorial cartoons and comedians continued to crack jokes about the incident, (Note: Attributed to multiple sources:) including a reference in the science fiction series Stargate SG-1. The incident was also featured in the 2018 movie Vice.

Cheney was criticized for his handling of the matter. According to polls on February 27, 2006, two weeks after the accident, his approval rating had dropped 5 percentage points to 18%.

Whittington died of complications from a fall on February 4, 2023, at the age of 95. Cheney died on November 3, 2025, at the age of 84.

== See also ==
- Burr–Hamilton duel – 1804 duel between Aaron Burr and Alexander Hamilton
- Hunting license – Regulatory or legal mechanism to control hunting
