= Abilene Reporter-News =

Daily newspaper in Abilene, Texas

- Type: Daily newspaper
- Format: Broadsheet
- Owner: USA Today Co.
- Publisher: Nathan Grimm
- Editor: Greg Jaklewicz
- Founded: 1881
- Headquarters: 101 Cypress Street; Abilene, TX 79601; United States
- Circulation: 2,601 (as of 2023)
- ISSN: 0199-3267
- OCLC number: 3967993
- Website: reporternews.com
- Free online archives: texashistory.unt.edu/explore/titles/t03563/ (1937–1975)

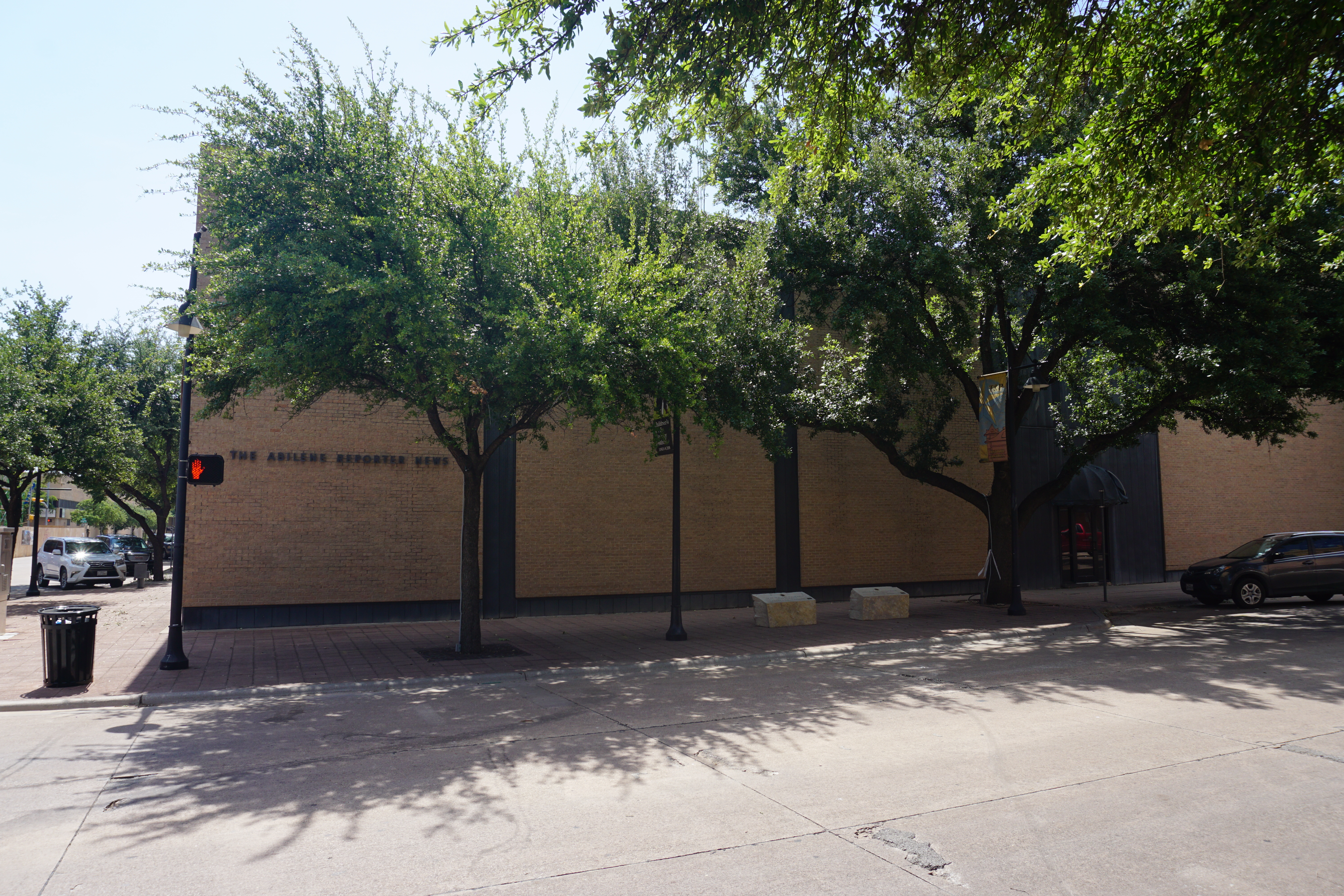
Abilene Reporter-News downtown office

Abilene Reporter-News is a daily newspaper based in Abilene, Texas, United States. The newspaper started publishing as the weekly Abilene Reporter, helmed by Charles Edwin Gilbert, on June 17, 1881, just three months after Abilene was founded. It is hence the oldest continuous business in the city. It became a daily newspaper in 1885.

== History ==
The newspaper, owned in the early 1920s by Bernard Hanks, became one of the two original flagships of the Harte-Hanks newspaper chain in 1924.

In 1937, the company merged its morning paper, The Morning News, with the afternoon Daily Reporter to form the Abilene Reporter-News. The newspaper published morning and evening editions into the 1950s.

The E. W. Scripps Company bought the newspaper, along with other Texas-based Harte-Hanks papers, in 1997. The company spun off its newspaper assets into Journal Media Group in April 2015, which was sold to Gannett in 2016.
