= Corpus Christi Caller-Times =

Newspaper published in Corpus Christi, Texas

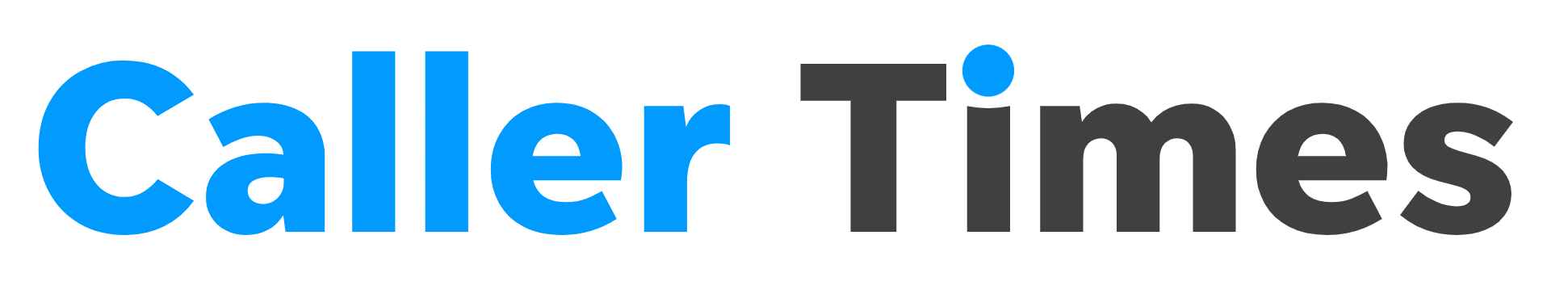
- Type: Daily newspaper
- Format: Broadsheet
- Owner: USA Today Co.
- Editor: Vicky Camarillo
- Founded: 1883
- Headquarters: 820 N. Lower Broadway; Corpus Christi, TX 78401; United States
- Circulation: 6,878 (as of 2023)
- ISSN: 0894-5365
- Website: caller.com

Caller times Building located in Corpus Christi Tx.

The Corpus Christi Caller-Times is the newspaper of record for Corpus Christi, Texas.

== History ==
The corpus Christi Caller times are a newspaper press that was developed and created in 1883 by newspapermen Eli Merriman, Ed Williams, and W. P. Caruthers. The original name was known as the Caller, which was named after the San Francisco Call, a known paper press that was established in California on December 1 ,1856. The caller ran daily between 1891 and 1896 and then moved to weekly in 1905. Later on, in 1910 the Caller merged with another local paper, the Herald, and became the Corpus Christi Caller and Daily Herald. A year later the press would be a daily paper again. In 1917 another local paper, the times, joined the press with partnership but would still keep the name of The Caller in 1918.Around this time subscription rates rose from two dollars in 1883 to six dollars in 1919. According to the caller, within the year it was the “largest circulation of any weekly newspaper published in southwest Texas." As time went on one of the Caller's original stockholders was King Ranch founder Richard King and his accomplice Mifflin Kennedy, would continue to be a holder until in 1928 Harte-Hanks Communications, would purchase the Caller times from Richard King.

The times were beforehand known as the Corpus Christi democrat, until W. E. Pope, a state legislator, purchased the Corpus Christi Daily Democrat in 1917, renamed it the Times. It wasn't until 1928 that he would sell the times to Houston Harte of San Angelo and Bernard Hanks of Abilene, founders of Harte-Hanks Communications. The next year Harte-Hanks bought the Caller from the King Ranch, and the two papers were combined as the Corpus Christi Caller-Times. It was one of the most successful and award-winning press that has lasted more than two dozen presses including the first two presses including The Star, and The Corpus Christi Gazette.

== Awards ==
Throughout the history of the Corpus Christ Caller-Times, they've picked up plenty of awards under different names. Both the print paper and Caller.com have solidified their reputation for professional and reliable reporting. Back in 2001, the Press Club of Dallas named the Caller-Times "Best Daily Newspaper" across a five-state region, in addition taking home nine extra "Katie" awards. As well as being in the "Under 100,000 circulation group", the paper was named best overall in 9 out of 13 years, coming in second place in three other times.

Continuing with having a winning streak, the team helped cover stories for the ''USA TODAY'' Network's border wall project, "The Wall," scored a Pulitzer Prize for Explanatory Reporting in 2018. The Texas Managing Editors also awarded them top honors for breaking news coverage during the 2017 water crisis, and their work on the Winter Storm URI in 2022, earned them a Charles E. Green Award. More recently, in 2024, the paper was awarded the First Amendment Award and placed third for ''Newsroom of the Year'', with reporters Quinton Martinez, Angela Piazza, and Olivia Garrett claiming top individual awards at the 2025 and 2026 Texas Managing Editors events.

== The newspaper in the news ==
Thus far in the paper's history on existing, they have covered a range of topics. From the death of Latin pop star Salena to the movie adaptation of Pearl harbor starring Ben Afleck and Johs Hartnett when the cast was aboard the Lexington to use for the film shooting.The Caller-Times was the first source to report on U.S. Vice President Dick Cheney's hunting accident. The accident took place in the early evening of Saturday, February 11, 2006. Katharine Armstrong, the owner of the ranch on which the accident took place, waited until the next morning to inform the Caller-Times.
