= Research data archiving =

Long-term storage of research data

Research data archiving is the long-term storage of scholarly research data, including the natural sciences, social sciences, and life sciences. The various academic journals have differing policies regarding how much of their data and methods researchers are required to store in a public archive, and what is actually archived varies widely between different disciplines. Similarly, the major grant-giving institutions have varying attitudes towards public archiving of data. In general, the tradition of science has been for publications to contain sufficient information to allow fellow researchers to replicate and therefore test the research. In recent years this approach has become increasingly strained as research in some areas depends on large datasets which cannot easily be replicated independently.

Data archiving is more important in some fields than others. In a few fields, all of the data necessary to replicate the work is already available in the journal article. In drug development, a great deal of data is generated and must be archived so researchers can verify that the reports the drug companies publish accurately reflect the data.

Often used interchangeably, Data preservation and data archiving are both about protecting data for the long term, but they serve different purposes. Data preservation focuses on preventing data from being lost, damaged, or destroyed by creating backups, storing data in secure locations, and ensuring it remains accessible when needed. Data archiving, on the other hand, involves moving data that is no longer actively used to a separate storage location for long-term keeping. Archived data is often combined and compressed, and while it can still be accessed, it is not intended for regular use or frequent updates.

The requirement of data archiving is a recent development in the history of science. It was made possible by advances in information technology allowing large amounts of data to be stored and accessed from central locations. For example, the American Geophysical Union (AGU) adopted their first policy on data archiving in 1993, about three years after the beginning of the WWW. This policy mandates that datasets cited in AGU papers must be archived by a recognised data center; it permits the creation of "data papers"; and it establishes AGU's role in maintaining data archives. But it makes no requirements on paper authors to archive their data.

Prior to organized data archiving, researchers wanting to evaluate or replicate a paper would have to request data and methods information from the author. The academic community expects authors to share supplemental data. This process was recognized as wasteful of time and energy and obtained mixed results. Information could become lost or corrupted over the years. In some cases, authors simply refuse to provide the information.

The need for data archiving and due diligence is greatly increased when the research deals with health issues or public policy formation.

== Selected policies by journals ==
=== Biotropica ===
Biotropica requires, as a condition for publication, that the data supporting the results in the paper and metadata describing them must be archived in an appropriate public archive such as Dryad, Figshare, GenBank, TreeBASE, or NCBI. Authors may elect to make the data publicly available as soon as the article is published or, if the technology of the archive allows, embargo access to the data up to three years after article publication. A statement describing Data Availability will be included in the manuscript as described in the instructions to authors. Exceptions to the required archiving of data may be granted at the discretion of the Editor-in-Chief for studies that include sensitive information (e.g., the location of endangered species). Our Editorial explaining the motivation for this policy can be found here. A more comprehensive list of data repositories is available here. Promoting a culture of collaboration with researchers who collect and archive data: The data collected by tropical biologists are often long-term, complex, and expensive to collect. The Board of Editors of Biotropica strongly encourages authors who re-use data archives archived data sets to include as fully engaged collaborators the scientists who originally collected them. We feel this will greatly enhance the quality and impact of the resulting research by drawing on the data collector’s profound insights into the natural history of the study system, reducing the risk of errors in novel analyses, and stimulating the cross-disciplinary and cross-cultural collaboration and training for which the ATBC and Biotropica are widely recognized.

NB: Biotropica is one of only two journals that pays the fees for authors depositing data at Dryad.

=== The American Naturalist ===
The American Naturalist requires authors to deposit the data associated with accepted papers in a public archive. For gene sequence data and phylogenetic trees, deposition in GenBank or TreeBASE, respectively, is required. There are many possible archives that may suit a particular data set, including the Dryad repository for ecological and evolutionary biology data. All accession numbers for GenBank, TreeBASE, and Dryad must be included in accepted manuscripts before they go to Production. If the data is deposited somewhere else, please provide a link. If the data is culled from published literature, please deposit the collated data in Dryad for the convenience of your readers. Any impediments to data sharing should be brought to the attention of the editors at the time of submission so that appropriate arrangements can be worked out.

=== Journal of Heredity ===
The primary data underlying the conclusions of an article are critical to the verifiability and transparency of the scientific enterprise, and should be preserved in usable form for decades in the future. For this reason, Journal of Heredity requires that newly reported nucleotide or amino acid sequences, and structural coordinates, be submitted to appropriate public databases (e.g., GenBank; the EMBL Nucleotide Sequence Database; DNA Database of Japan; the Protein Data Bank; and Swiss-Prot). Accession numbers must be included in the final version of the manuscript. For other forms of data (e.g., microsatellite genotypes, linkage maps, images), the Journal endorses the principles of the Joint Data Archiving Policy (JDAP) in encouraging all authors to archive primary datasets in an appropriate public archive, such as Dryad, TreeBASE, or the Knowledge Network for Biocomplexity. Authors are encouraged to make data publicly available at time of publication or, if the technology of the archive allows, opt to embargo access to the data for a period up to a year after publication. The American Genetic Association also recognizes the vast investment of individual researchers in generating and curating large datasets. Consequently, we recommend that this investment be respected in secondary analyses or meta-analyses in a gracious collaborative spirit.

— oxfordjournals.org

=== Molecular Ecology ===
Molecular Ecology expects that data supporting the results in the paper should be archived in an appropriate public archive, such as GenBank, Gene Expression Omnibus, TreeBASE, Dryad, the Knowledge Network for Biocomplexity, your own institutional or funder repository, or as Supporting Information on the Molecular Ecology web site. Data are important products of the scientific enterprise, and they should be preserved and usable for decades in the future. Authors may elect to have the data publicly available at time of publication, or, if the technology of the archive allows, may opt to embargo access to the data for a period up to a year after publication. Exceptions may be granted at the discretion of the editor, especially for sensitive information such as human subject data or the location of endangered species.

— Wiley

=== Nature ===
Such material must be hosted on an accredited independent site (URL and accession numbers to be provided by the author), or sent to the Nature journal at submission, either uploaded via the journal's online submission service, or if the files are too large or in an unsuitable format for this purpose, on CD/DVD (five copies). Such material cannot solely be hosted on an author's personal or institutional web site. Nature requires the reviewer to determine if all of the supplementary data and methods have been archived. The policy advises reviewers to consider several questions, including: "Should the authors be asked to provide supplementary methods or data to accompany the paper online? (Such data might include source code for modelling studies, detailed experimental protocols or mathematical derivations.)

— Nature

=== Science ===
Science supports the efforts of databases that aggregate published data for the use of the scientific community. Therefore, before publication, large data sets (including microarray data, protein or DNA sequences, and atomic coordinates or electron microscopy maps for macromolecular structures) must be deposited in an approved database and an accession number provided for inclusion in the published paper. "Materials and methods" – Science now requests that, in general, authors place the bulk of their description of materials and methods online as supporting material, providing only as much methods description in the print manuscript as is necessary to follow the logic of the text. (Obviously, this restriction will not apply if the paper is fundamentally a study of a new method or technique.)

— Science

=== Royal Society ===
To allow others to verify and build on the work published in Royal Society journals, it is a condition of publication that authors make available the data, code and research materials supporting the results in the article.

Datasets and code should be deposited in an appropriate, recognised, publicly available repository. Where no data-specific repository exists, authors should deposit their datasets in a general repository such as Dryad (repository) or Figshare.

— Royal Society

=== Journal of Archaeological Science ===
The Journal of Archaeological Science has had a data disclosure policy since at least 2013. Their policy states that 'all data relating to the article must be made available in Supplementary files or deposited in external repositories and linked to within the article. The policy recommends that data are deposited in a repository such as the Archaeology Data Service, the Digital Archaeological Record, or PANGAEA. A 2018 study found a data availability rate of 53%, reflecting either weak enforcement of this policy or an incomplete understanding among editors, reviewers, and authors of how to interpret and implement this policy.

== Policies by funding agencies ==
In the United States, the National Science Foundation (NSF) has tightened requirements on data archiving. Researchers seeking funding from NSF are now required to file a data management plan as a two-page supplement to the grant application.

The NSF Datanet initiative has resulted in funding of the Data Observation Network for Earth (DataONE) project, which will provide scientific data archiving for ecological and environmental data produced by scientists worldwide. DataONE's stated goal is to preserve and provide access to multi-scale, multi-discipline, and multi-national data. The community of users for DataONE includes scientists, ecosystem managers, policy makers, students, educators, and the public.

The German DFG requires that research data should be archived in the researcher's own institution or an appropriate nationwide infrastructure for at least 10 years.

The British Digital Curation Centre maintains an overview of funder's data policies.

== Data library ==
Data Repository and an Archive Repository

Research data is archived in data libraries or data archives. A data library, data archive, or data repository is a collection of numeric and/or geospatial data sets for secondary use in research. A data library is normally part of a larger institution (academic, corporate, scientific, medical, governmental, etc.). established for research data archiving and to serve the data users of that organisation. The data library tends to house local data collections and provides access to them through various means (CD-/DVD-ROMs or central server for download). A data library may also maintain subscriptions to licensed data resources for its users to access the information. Whether a data library is also considered a data archive may depend on the extent of unique holdings in the collection, whether long-term preservation services are offered, and whether it serves a broader community (as national data archives do). Most public data libraries are listed in the Registry of Research Data Repositories.

=== Importance and services ===
In August 2001, the Association of Research Libraries (ARL) published a report presenting results from a survey of ARL member institutions involved in collecting and providing services for numeric data resources.

Library service providing support at the institutional level for the use of numerical and other types of datasets in research. Amongst the support activities typically available:

- Reference Assistance — locating numeric or geospatial datasets containing measurable variables on a particular topic or group of topics, in response to a user query.
- User Instruction — providing hands-on training to groups of users in locating data resources on particular topics, how to download data and read it into spreadsheet, statistical, database, or GIS packages, how to interpret codebooks and other documentation.
- Technical Assistance - including easing registration procedures, troubleshooting problems with the dataset, such as errors in the documentation, reformatting data into something a user can work with, and helping with statistical methodology.
- Collection Development & Management - acquire, maintain, and manage a collection of data files used for secondary analysis by the local user community; purchase institutional data subscriptions; act as a site representative to data providers and national data archives for the institution.
- Preservation and Data Sharing Services - act on a strategy of preservation of datasets in the collection, such as media refreshment and file format migration; download and keep records on updated versions from a central repository. Also, assist users in preparing original data for secondary use by others; either for deposit in a central or institutional repository, or for less formal ways of sharing data. This may also involve marking up the data into an appropriate XML standard, such as the Data Documentation Initiative, or adding other metadata to facilitate online discovery.

== Examples of data libraries ==
=== Natural sciences ===
The following list refers to scientific data archives.

- Archaeology Data Service
- CISL Research Data Archive
- DataONE
- Dryad
- ESO/ST-ECF Science Archive Facility
- International Tree-Ring Data Bank
- Inter-university Consortium for Political and Social Research
- Knowledge Network for Biocomplexity
- National Archive of Computerized Data on Aging
- National Archive of Criminal Justice Data
- NCAR Research Data Archive: http://rda.ucar.edu
- National Climatic Data Center
- National Geophysical Data Center
- National Snow and Ice Data Center
- National Oceanographic Data Center
- Oak Ridge National Laboratory Distributed Active Archive Center
- Pangaea - Data Publisher for Earth & Environmental Science
- NASA SeaBASS - Data archive for ocean color data
- World Data Center

=== Social sciences ===
In the social sciences, data libraries are referred to as data archives. Data archives are professional institutions for the acquisition, preparation, preservation, and dissemination of social and behavioral data. Data archives in the social sciences evolved in the 1950s and have been perceived as an international movement:

By 1964 the International Social Science Council (ISSC) had sponsored a second conference on Social Science Data Archives and had a standing Committee on Social Science Data, both of which stimulated the data archives movement. By the beginning of the twenty-first century, most developed countries and some developing countries had organized formal and well-functioning national data archives. In addition, college and university campuses often have `data libraries' that make data available to their faculty, staff, and students; most of these bear minimal archival responsibility, relying for that function on a national institution (Rockwell, 2001, p. 3227).

- re3data.org is a global registry of research data repository indexing data archives from all disciplines: http://www.re3data.org
- CESSDA Members are data archives and other organisations that archive social science data and provide data for secondary use: https://www.cessda.eu/About/Consortium
- Consortium of European Social Science Data Archives: http://www.cessda.org/
- Finnish Social Science Data Archive (FSD): http://www.fsd.uta.fi/
- The Danish Data Archives: http://www.sa.dk/content/us/about_us; specific page (only in Danish): https://web.archive.org/web/20150318230743/http://www.sa.dk/dda/default.htm
- Inter-university Consortium for Political and Social Research: http://www.icpsr.umich.edu/
- The Roper Center for Public Opinion Research: https://ropercenter.cornell.edu/
- The Social Science Data Archive: http://dataarchives.ss.ucla.edu/
- The Cornell Center for Social Sciences: https://socialsciences.cornell.edu/computing-and-data/data-services/data-and-reproduction-archive

== See also ==
- Data bank
- Data center
- Data curation
- Digital curation
- Digital preservation
- Open Data

== Notes ==
- Registry of Research Data Repositories re3data.org
- Statistical checklist required by Nature
- Policies of Proceedings of the National Academy of Sciences (U.S.)
- The US National Committee for CODATA
- The Role of Data and Program Code Archives in the Future of Economic Research
- Data sharing and replication – Gary King website
- The Case for Due Diligence When Empirical Research is Used in Policy Formation by McCullough and McKitrick
- Thoughts on Refereed Journal Publication by Chuck Doswell
- “How to encourage the right behaviour” An opinion piece published in Nature, March, 2002.
- NASA Astrophysics Data System
- Panton Principles for Open Data in Science, at Citizendium
- Inter-university Consortium for Political and Social Research
