= Dryad (repository) =

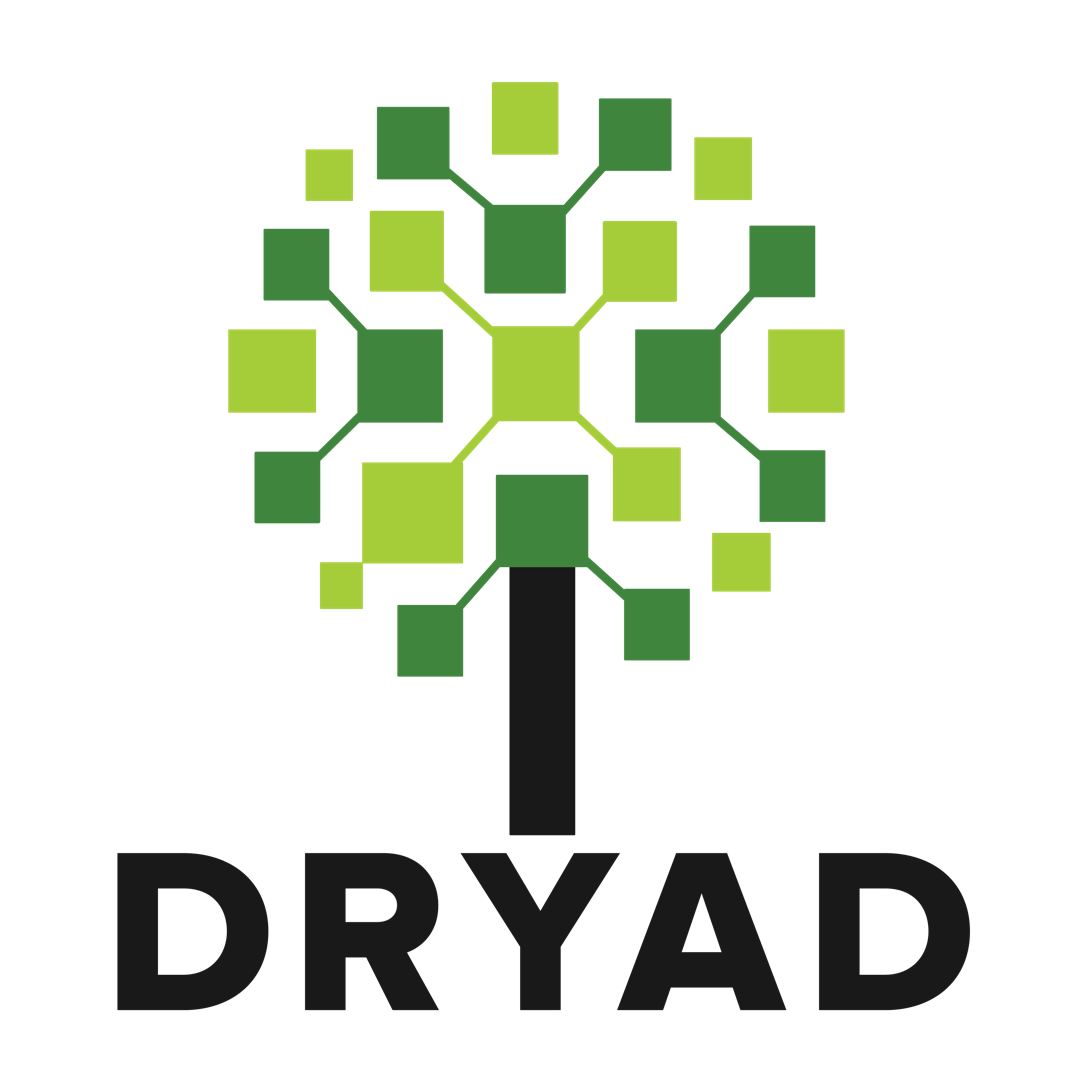
- Developers: National Evolutionary Synthesis Center, UNC-CH Metadata Research Center, Oxford University, The British Library, California Digital Library
- Initial release: January 2008
- Repository: github.com/CDL-Dryad/dryad
- Written in: Ruby
- License: New BSD license
- Website: datadryad.org

Dryad is an international open-access repository of research data, especially data underlying scientific and medical publications (mainly of evolutionary, genetic, and ecology biology). Dryad is a curated general-purpose repository that makes data discoverable, freely reusable, and citable. The scientific, educational, and charitable mission of Dryad is to provide the infrastructure for and promote the re-use of scholarly research data.

The vision of Dryad is a scholarly communication system in which learned societies, publishers, institutions of research and education, funding bodies and other stakeholders collaboratively sustain and promote the preservation and reuse of research data.

Dryad aims to allow researchers to validate published findings, explore new analysis methodologies, re-purpose data for research questions unanticipated by the original authors, and perform synthetic studies such as formal meta-analyses. For many publications, existing data repositories do not capture the whole data package. As a result, many important datasets are not being preserved and are no longer available, or usable, at the time that they are sought by later investigators.

Dryad serves as a repository for tables, spreadsheets, flat files, and all other kinds of published data for which specialized repositories do not already exist. Optimally, authors submit data to Dryad in conjunction with article publication, so that links to the data can be included in the published article. All data files in Dryad are associated with a published article, and are made available for reuse under the terms of a Creative Commons Zero waiver.

Dryad is also a non-profit membership organization registered in the US, providing a forum for all stakeholders to set priorities for the repository, participate in planning, and share knowledge and coordinate action around data policies.

Dryad is listed in the Registry of Research Data Repositories re3data.org.

== Features ==
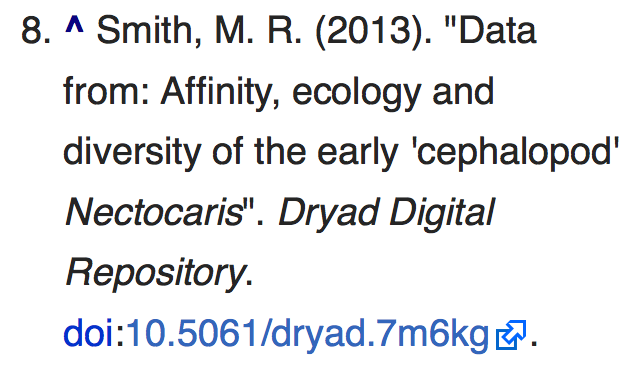
A citation to a Dryad data package on Wikipedia

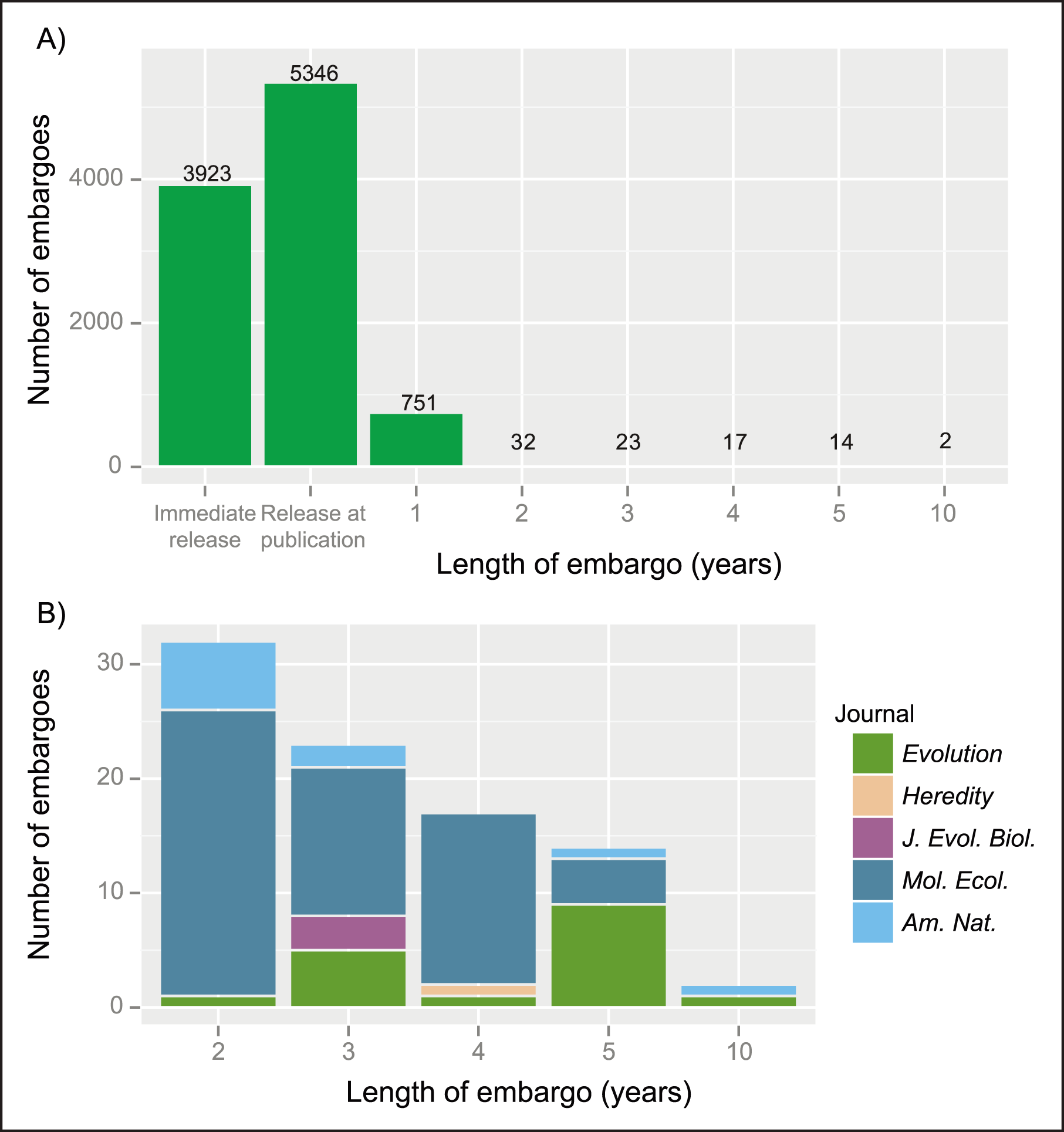
Embargoes chosen by Dryad data authors

Dryad enables authors, journals, societies and publishers to facilitate data archiving at the time of publication, when the data are readily available. Data in Dryad receives a permanent, unique Digital object identifier (DOI), which can be included in the published article so that readers are able to access the data. Authors can archive data in Dryad and be assured of its preservation, while satisfying journals' and research funding agencies' mandates to disseminate their research outputs.

Authors submit data to Dryad either when the associated article is under review or has been accepted for publication. The choice depends on whether the journal includes data within the scope of peer reviewer. Authors may also submit data after an article has been published.

Data submission is facilitated by journals sending notices of new manuscripts to Dryad. This saves authors from having to re-enter the bibliographic details when they upload their data files.

Dryad curators review submitted data files and perform quality control on metadata descriptions before inclusion of new content in the repository. Dryad’s metadata approach emphasizes simplicity and interoperability, supported by a Dublin Core metadata application profile. The Metadata Research Center now at the College of Computing and Informatics, Drexel University, formerly served as Dryad’s central curation hub, with primary curation activity now taking place via the non-profit in North Carolina.

Dryad coordinates data submission to specialized repositories where in order to (a) lower user burden by streamlining the submission workflow and (b) allow Dryad and specialized repositories to exchange identifiers and other metadata in order to enable cross-referencing of the different data products associated with a given publication. The first two handshaking partners are TreeBASE and GenBank, which Dryad's partner journals have previously identified as required points of deposition for phylogenetic tree data and DNA sequences, respectively.

== Governance, history and funding ==
Dryad is governed by a twelve-member Board of Directors, elected by its Members. Members may be independent journals, societies, publishers, research and educational institutions, libraries, funders, or other organizations that support Dryad's mission. The organization coordinates data sharing policies and promotes the long-term sustainability of the repository.

Dryad began charging submission fees in September 2013. Dryad is a nonprofit organization that provides long-term access to its contents at no cost to researchers, educators or students, irrespective of nationality or institutional affiliation. Dryad is able to provide free access to data due to financial support from members and data submitters. Dryad’s submission fees are designed to sustain its core functions by recovering the basic costs of curating and preserving data.

Dryad emerged from a National Evolutionary Synthesis Center (NESCent) workshop entitled "Digital data preservation, sharing, and discovery: Challenges for Small Science Communities in the Digital Era" in May 2007. Initial funding for Dryad was provided by the National Science Foundation to the National Evolutionary Synthesis Center and other partners in the US.

DryadUK was a Jisc-funded project run from the British Library and the University of Oxford, in partnership with NESCent, the Digital Curation Centre, and Charles Beagrie Ltd. The project led to a UK mirror of the Dryad repository based at the British Library. The project also improved the tools available for the publication and citation of data, expanded the disciplinary range of participating journals, and further developed the business framework for an international organization dedicated to long-term data preservation.

In 2019, Dryad announced a partnership with fellow data-repository Zenodo to co-develop new solutions focused on supporting researcher and publisher workflows as well as best practices in software and data curation.

Dryad is a member of the Data Observation Network for Earth (DataONE).

== Software ==
Dryad was originally built upon the open source DSpace repository software, developed by the Massachusetts Institute of Technology and Hewlett-Packard. In 2019, Dryad migrated to an open-source, Ruby-on-Rails data publication platform called Stash.

== See also ==
- Scientific data archiving
- Data sharing
