= Pythagoras (disambiguation) =

Pythagoras was a Greek mathematician and philosopher.

Pythagoras may also refer to:

- Pythagoras (boxer) (late 6th century BC), an ancient Greek wrestler from Samos
- Pythagoras (sculptor) (fl. 5th century BC), an ancient Greek sculptor from Samos
- Pythagoras the Spartan (late 5th century BC to 4th century BC), a mercenary Greek Admiral
- Pythagoras, a 4th-century BC Macedonian hepatomancer mentioned by Arrian, and brother to Apollodorus of Amphipolis
- Pythagoras (freedman) (1st century AD), a Roman freedman married to emperor Nero
- Pythagoras (crater), a lunar impact crater
- Pythagoras ABM, an agent-based model
- Pythagoras Papastamatiou or simply Pythagoras, a 20th-century Greek writer
- 6143 Pythagoras, a main-belt asteroid
- Pythagoras Award, is an award given annually to Bulgarian nationals by the Ministry of Science and Education of Bulgaria in recognition for outstanding scientific achievements

== See also ==
- Pythagoras tree (fractal), a plane fractal made of squares
- Tree of primitive Pythagorean triples
- Pythagorean theorem
- Pnytagoras, king of the Ancient Greek city state of Salamis, 351–331 BC
