= Environmental informatics =

Information science applied to environmental science

Environmental informatics is the science of information applied to environmental science. As such, it provides the information processing and communication infrastructure to the interdisciplinary field of environmental sciences aiming at data, information and knowledge integration, the application of computational intelligence to environmental data as well as the identification of environmental impacts of information technology. Environmental informatics thus acts as a bridge, providing an interdisciplinary means of analysing, describing and understanding the complex interactions between humans, nature and technology.

Since each field of applied computer science has its own subject matter, terminology and methods, specialised disciplines, such as environmental, bio- and geoinformatics have emerged, each of which combines computer science with a specific field of application such as environmental, bio- or geosciences. Environmental informatics, bioinformatics and geoinformatics all deal with computer-based processing of environmental phenomena. However, environmental informatics is the only field that pursues normative goals (e.g., political goals of environmental protection, environmental planning, and sustainability). This also influences the choice of methods. This also distinguishes it from application areas such as numerical weather prediction, which is considered an early and important example of computer simulation of environmental phenomena.

The UK Natural Environment Research Council defines environmental informatics as the "research and system development focusing on the environmental sciences relating to the creation, collection, storage, processing, modelling, interpretation, display and dissemination of data and information." Kostas Karatzas defined environmental informatics as the "creation of a new 'knowledge-paradigm' towards serving environmental management needs." Karatzas argued further that environmental informatics "is an integrator of science, methods and techniques and not just the result of using information and software technology methods and tools for serving environmental engineering needs."

Environmental informatics emerged in early 1990 in Central Europe.

Current initiatives to effectively manage, share, and reuse environmental and ecological data are indicative of the increasing importance of fields like environmental informatics and ecoinformatics to develop the foundations for effectively managing ecological information. Examples of these initiatives are National Science Foundation Datanet projects, DataONE and Data Conservancy.

== Subject matter and objectives ==
The subject of environmental informatics are environmental information systems (EIS). An EIS 'is a computer-based system that integrates and stores data collected about the natural environment and provides powerful methods for accessing and evaluating it.' This allows environmental data to be processed by computers for environmental protection, planning, research and technology.

According to Jaeschke and Bossel, environmental informatics has three interrelated objectives:

1. Environmental informatics serves to procure data and information for describing the state and development of the environment. Of particular importance is information that is needed to prevent or limit undesirable changes and to support desirable changes.
2. Based on the evaluation and analysis of data, environmental informatics improves our understanding of the environment and the interactions between nature, technology and society. It thus supports environmentally relevant decisions.
3. This enables the influence of development (system correction), the assessment of the effects and side effects of potential measures, and the creation of tools for the routine planning, implementation and monitoring of measures.

== History ==
The simulation model World3, which formed the basis of the highly acclaimed study The Limits to Growth, is considered the starting point of environmental informatics. It incorporated environmental information, among other things, to calculate scenarios for global development. In the mid-1980s, interest grew in structuring environmental protection as an area of application for computer science. One of the first publications in German was the book Informatik im Umweltschutz. Anwendungen und Perspektiven (Computer science in environmental protection. Applications and perspectives) from 1986. The term 'environmental informatics' did not appear until around 1993, which is why the development of environmental informatics is usually referred to as having taken place in the 1990s. In 1993, the first university chair for environmental informatics was established in Cottbus. In 1994, the anthology Umweltinformatik. Informatikmethoden für Umweltschutz und Umweltforschung (Environmental Informatics: Informatics Methods for Environmental Protection and Environmental Research) was published. The development of environmental informatics was 'primarily initiated by German computer science.' In the English-speaking world, the volume Environmental Informatics was published in 1995, mainly based on the German anthology of 1994.

An article in the conference proceedings of the World Computer Congress of the International Federation for Information Processing (IFIP) in Hamburg in 1994 describes the initial situation of environmental informatics as follows:

'On the one hand, we suffer from the huge amount of available data – people sometimes speak of data graveyards – on the other hand, the really relevant data may still be missing.'

This statement indicates the need that led to the emergence of environmental informatics as a specialised discipline of applied computer science. Furthermore, the specific characteristics and processing requirements of environmental data necessitated the emergence of environmental informatics. The special features of environmental data include:

- The data structures required are highly heterogeneous due to specific processes and differing perspectives on environmental aspects (e.g., water protection, emission control, hazardous substances).
- In addition to the heterogeneity of the data, heterogeneous databases also play a role, as environmental data is often obtained and presented in an interdisciplinary manner.
- Obligations change frequently as a result of new legislation, whether regional (e.g. state regulations on water protection), national (e.g. federal emission control regulations) or international (e.g. Registration, Evaluation, Authorisation and Restriction of Chemicals|REACH).
- The objects represented are often multidimensional and, therefore, require complex geometric representation using curves or polygons.
- It is often necessary to process uncertain, imprecise or incomplete data, which is, for example, the result of extrapolations or forecasts.

A new "knowledge paradigm" has emerged to meet the requirements of environmental management. Environmental informatics produces its own concepts, methods and techniques and is not merely the result of using information and communication technology methods and tools to meet environmental requirements.

The development of environmental informatics since the 1990s has been significantly influenced by the newly established conferences EnviroInfo, ISESS and ITEE and is documented in the respective proceedings. Aspects of sustainability and sustainable development were increasingly integrated into environmental informatics after 2000, thereby expanding the field. In 2004, the Working Group on Sustainable Information Society of the Gesellschaft für Informatik e. V. (German Informatics Society, GI) published the Memorandum on a Sustainable Information Society, which formulates recommendations for an information society that is compatible with human, social and natural needs. Since 2007, environmental informatics has often been described in more detail as informatics for environmental protection, sustainable development and risk management. The increased focus on sustainability has also contributed to the formation of the research focus Information and Communications Technology for Sustainability (ICT4S) and to the emergence of the international conference ICT4S in 2013.

ICT-ENSURE, the European Commission's funding measure for the establishment of a European research area on "ICT for Environmental Sustainability Research" (2008–2010), has also contributed to the structuring of environmental informatics.

== Environmental informatics and sustainable development ==
Efforts to place environmental informatics within the context of sustainable development have been growing since 2000 and were significantly influenced by the Memorandum on a Sustainable Information Society. According to this Memorandum, the information society offers great but unevenly distributed opportunities for education, participation and intercultural understanding. In addition, the Memorandum highlighted the material and energy consumption of information and communication technology and the amount of waste it generates. The hope was expressed that environmental informatics could contribute to the formation of a consensus in environmental policy and, thus, to the development of sustainable action strategies. The systematic collection, processing and analysis of environmental data should lead to better environmental monitoring, better environmental management and progress in the sustainable management of natural resources. In fact, the topics addressed in environmental informatics since the 1980s and the further development of remote sensing methods are widely used, e.g. in the environmental information systems of different countries.

== Related research areas ==
Environmental informatics, like Green Computing and the ICT4S, lies at the intersection of computer science and sustainable development. While environmental informatics deals with environmental information systems and the corresponding data collection, storage, reproduction, analysis and evaluation, Green Computing is primarily concerned with the IT infrastructure itself, whose undesirable effects on the environment should be kept to a minimum. ICT4S, on the other hand, takes a broader perspective than environmental informatics by examining the opportunities and risks of digitalisation for achieving sustainable development in general and raising questions about the social malleability of digitalisation.

Other areas of research within computer science that explore the relationship between technical information processing and nature in the broadest sense includes bioinformatics and geoinformatics. Apart from the common feature of computer-aided environmental information processing, the three disciplines differ primarily in their choice of methods. In addition, environmental informatics has a normative orientation, as it aims to prevent or limit undesirable environmental changes and support desirable ones. However, the relationship between geoinformatics and environmental informatics is particularly close, as geographic information systems (GIS) serve as the basic technology for spatial environmental information systems and remote sensing has opened up new possibilities for environmental monitoring.

== Conferences ==
- EnviroInfo 2013, 2012
- Environmental Information Management 2011, 2008
- International Conference on Adaptive and Natural Computing Algorithms ICANNGA
- International Conference on ICT for Sustainability (ICT4S) 2014, 2013
- International Conference on Information Technologies in Environmental Engineering 2013
- International Congress on Environmental Modelling and Software (iEMSs) 2014, 2012, 2010
- International Congress on Modelling and Simulation (MODSIM) 2013
- International Symposium on Environmental Software Systems (ISESS) 2013, 2011

== Journals ==
- ACM Transactions on Sensor Networks
- Computers and Electronics in Agriculture
- Earth Science Informatics
- Earth System Science Data
- Environmental Earth Sciences
- Environmental Modelling and Software
- Environmental Monitoring and Assessment
- IEEE Journal of Selected Topics in Applied Earth Observations and Remote Sensing
- International Journal of Agricultural and Environmental Information Systems
- International Journal of Digital Earth
- International Journal of Distributed Sensor Networks
- International Journal of Sensor Networks
- Journal of Environmental Informatics
- Journal of Environmental Informatics Letters

== Institutions ==
- Aalto University: Environmental Informatics
- Aristotle University of Thessaloniki: Informatics Applications and Systems Group, Dept. of Mechanical Engineering: Teaching and Research on Environmental Informatics and Quality of Life Information Services
- CSIRO: Environmental Informatics Research Group
- Institute for Environmental Analytics: Applied environmental informatics, based at the University of Reading, UK
- Griffith University: Environmental Informatics, a research institute
- Lancaster Environment Center: Centre for environmental informatics
- Lincoln University: GIS and Environmental Informatics
- Masaryk University: Division of environmental informatics and modeling
- Northern Arizona University: PhD in Environmental Informatics
- NUI Galway: Environmental informatics
- RISSAC: Department of environmental informatics, research institute for soil science and agricultural chemistry, Hungarian academy of sciences
- Stanford University: Sustainable development & environmental informatics
- Tokyo Institute of Technology: Department of Mechanical and Environmental Informatics
- TU Graz: Research focus area in environmental informatics
- University of California, Irvine: Bren school environmental informatics research
- University of Dayton: Center of excellence for strategic energy and environmental informatics
- University of Eastern Finland: Division of environmental informatics within the department of environmental science at Kuopio Campus
- University of Hamburg: Research in environmental informatics
- University of Las Vegas, Nevada: Environmental informatics undergraduate program
- University of Marburg: Physical Geography: Environmental Informatics
- University of Michigan: Environmental informatics GIS and modeling graduate program
- University of South Australia: Environmental Informatics postgraduate course
- University of Oldenburg: Division of environmental informatics
- University of Sunderland: Centre for environmental informatics
- University of Applied Sciences (HTW) Berlin: Research and undergraduate program
- : Professional Science Graduate Program: Environmental Informatics
- Vienna University of Technology: Doctoral College: Environmental Informatics
- Virginia Polytechnic Institute: Undergraduate Program: Environmental Informatics

== Collaborations ==
- DataONE: Data Observation Network for Earth
- Data Conservancy: Leading the movement to build data management tools and services across institutions and disciplines
