= Environmental data rescue =

Storage of historic weather data in a usable format

Environmental data rescue is a collection of processes, including photography and scanning, that stores historical and modern environmental data in a usable format. The data is then analyzed and used in scientific models. Historical weather information helps meteorologists and climatologists understand past trends in weather changes, which helps them forecast and predict future weather.

One method takes digital photographs of environmental data stored on paper media and then ships the images to a facility where they are entered into a database.

Throughout the world, some estimate 700,000 pieces of data are lost every day due to inks fading, paper deteriorating, magnetic tape print-through etc. A rough estimate of 100 billion parameter values that are still on paper exists, microfiche, microfilm, and magnetic tape that are in a format unusable by computers and scientists alike, which need to be digitized. This data is stored on a variety of media from paper, microfiche, to older magnetic tapes that are going bad.

Once data is digitized, it can be used to help a large range of people from farmers to engineers and in scientific pursuits such as climate studies. Historical environmental data are also used as a basis for "Disease Vectorization" where the areal spread of airborne diseases are correlated to historical weather conditions so that in future outbreaks, health care teams can predict the direction and rate of spread of the disease so that remedial actions can begin before the disease reaches the vulnerable population. Historic data are also used in designing structures such as bridges and buildings, assist the 1.8 billion subsistence farmers throughout the world better plan crops alleviating starvation.

National Climatic Data Center is the current collection point for this data within the National Oceanic & Atmospheric Administration. The International Environmental Data Rescue Organization, a 501(C)(3) non-profit organization has also already participated in the rescue and digitization of one million historic weather observations in Africa and South America.

== See also ==
- Citizen science
- Data archiving
- List of years in the environment
