= Brown Dog =

Brown Dog may refer to

- Brown Dog affair, 1900s-decade English vivisection controversy
- NCSA Brown Dog, legacy-data access facility
- A dog with a brown coat of fur
- "Brown Dog", a song by The Young Dubliners

== See also ==
- Brown Dog Tick
