= PANGAEA (data library) =

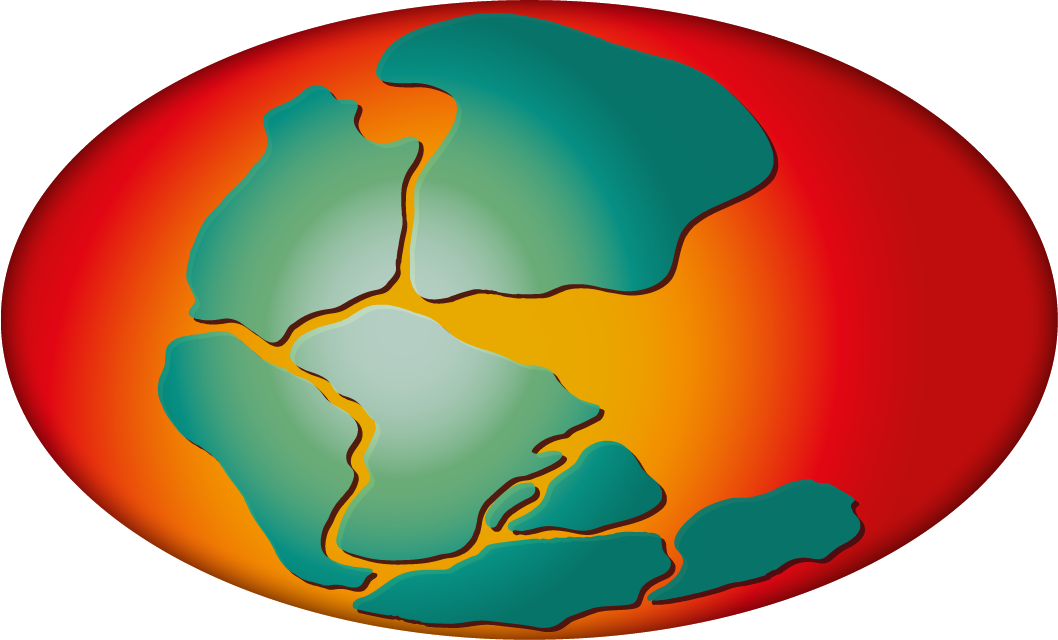
The PANGAEA logo shows the supercontinent Pangaea at about 150 Million years ago in an artistic vision.

An example of the data stored in PANGAEA - an audio recording of a "singing" iceberg, from doi:10.1594/PANGAEA.339110. Most datasets are much larger.

PANGAEA - Data Publisher for Earth & Environmental Science is a digital data library and a data publisher for earth system science. Data can be georeferenced in time (date/time or geological age) and space (latitude, longitude, depth/height).

Scientific data are archived with related metainformation in a relational database (Sybase) through an editorial system. Data are in Open Access and are distributed through web services in standard formats on the Internet through various search engines and portals. Data set descriptions (metadata) are conform to the ISO 19115 standard and are served in various further formats (e.g. Directory Interchange Format, Dublin Core). They include a bibliographic citation and are persistently identified using Digital Object Identifiers (DOI). Identifier provision and long-term availability of data sets via library catalogs is ensured through a cooperation with the German National Library of Science and Technology (TIB). Retrieval of data sets is provided through a full text search engine (based on Apache Lucene / panFMP). For efficient data compilations a data warehouse is operated. Data descriptions are available through various protocols (OAI-PMH, Web Catalog Service).

PANGAEA is hosted by the Alfred Wegener Institute, Helmholtz Centre for Polar and Marine Research (AWI), Bremerhaven and the MARUM – Center for Marine Environmental Sciences, Bremen in Germany. The system is used by various international research projects from public funding as data repository and by the World Data Center for Marine Environmental Sciences (WDC-MARE) as long-term archive. The system was initially developed since 1987 and is operational on the Internet since 1995.

The MediaWiki software is used to operate a wiki as PANGAEA manual and reference.

PANGAEA is also listed in re3data.org.
