= Zenodo =

Research data repository

- Producer: CERN (Switzerland)
- Languages: English, French

Access
- Cost: Free

Coverage
- Disciplines: Miscellaneous
- Record depth: Index, abstract, full text
- Format coverage: Journals, conference papers, research papers, data sets, research software, report

Links
- Website: zenodo.org

Zenodo is a general-purpose open repository developed under the European OpenAIRE program and operated by CERN. It allows researchers to deposit research papers, data sets, research software, reports, and any other research related digital artefacts. For each submission, a persistent digital object identifier (DOI) is minted, which makes the stored items easily citeable.

== Characteristics ==
Zenodo was launched on 8 May 2013, as the successor of the OpenAIRE Orphan Records Repository to let researchers in any subject area comply with any open science deposit requirement absent an institutional repository. It was relaunched as Zenodo in 2015 to provide a place for researchers to deposit datasets; it allows the uploading of files up to 50 GB.

It provides a DOI to datasets and other submitted data that lacks one to make the work easier to cite and supports various data and license types. One supported source is GitHub repositories. Zenodo also provides researchers with further features, such as the option to publish files with an embargo, meaning that only metadata will be shown until the end of the embargo period.

Zenodo is supported by CERN "as a marginal activity", also receiving financial contributions via the CERN & Society Foundation, and hosted on the high-performance computing infrastructure that is primarily operated for the needs of high-energy physics.

Zenodo is run with Invenio (a free software framework for large-scale digital repositories), wrapped by a small extra layer of code that is also called Zenodo.

Zenodo is named after the Greek librarian Zenodotus.

== History ==
In 2019, Zenodo announced a partnership with the fellow data repository Dryad to co-develop new solutions focused on supporting researcher and publisher workflows as well as best practices in software and data curation.

As of 2021, Zenodo's publicly available statistics for open items reported a total of over 45 million "unique views" and over 55 million "unique downloads".

Also in 2021, Zenodo reported it had crossed 1 petabyte in hosted data and 15 million yearly visits.

In 2026, Zenodo confirmed that records from users submitting files without an academic affiliation may be de-ranked and not indexed by external search engines. The same applies to users who have not been manually verified by Zenodo.
