= National Evolutionary Synthesis Center =

Scientific research center in Durham, North Carolina

Coordinates: 36.007121°N 78.923442°W

The United States National Evolutionary Synthesis Center (NESCent) is a scientific research center in Durham, North Carolina. Known by its acronym NESCent (which rhymes with “crescent”), the center’s goal is to promote collaborative, cross-disciplinary research in evolutionary biology.

NESCent offers a range of fellowships for visiting scientists and educators and sponsors numerous scientific meetings each year. In its first 7 years, NESCent hosted nearly 4,200 visitors from more than 50 countries. Sponsored projects span the fields of systematics, paleontology, molecular evolution, phylogeography, comparative biology, evolutionary genetics, population biology and functional morphology, among others.

The logo of the National Evolutionary Synthesis Center

== Mission ==
NESCent promotes the synthesis of information, concepts and knowledge to address significant, emerging, or novel questions in evolutionary science and its applications. NESCent achieves this by supporting research and education across disciplinary, institutional, geographic, and demographic boundaries.

== History and funding ==
NESCent was founded in December 2004 with a grant from the US National Science Foundation, and is jointly operated by Duke University, North Carolina State University, and the University of North Carolina at Chapel Hill. In the fall of 2009, NESCent was awarded a second 5-year grant from the National Science Foundation, which will provide funding for the center through 2014.

== Major programs ==
NESCent sponsors a number of research and training programs for graduate students, postdoctoral fellows, faculty, and groups. Examples include:

- Catalysis meetings
- Working groups
- Postdoctoral fellowships
- Sabbatical fellowships
- Graduate fellowships
- Short-term visitor fellowships
- Postgraduate-level courses on topics related to evolution

== Senior leadership ==
NESCent’s Directorate consists of:

- Allen Rodrigo, Center Director
- Susan Alberts, Associate Director of Science and Synthesis
- Todd Vision, Associate Director of Informatics
- Brian Wiegmann, Associate Director of Education and Outreach

In addition, NESCent has an external Advisory Board and Operations Committee that meet on a regular basis to advise the Directors and oversee the center.

== Scientists-in-residence and in-house staff ==
NESCent has 15-20 full-time employees and several employees on a part-time or contractual basis. In addition, approximately 10 postdoctoral fellows and 2-3 sabbatical scholars typically work on-site at the center at any given time.

== Informatics at NESCent ==
NESCent’s informatics team plays an active role in developing cyberinfrastructure for the scientific community, with a focus on open source software, database development, IT support, and analytical tools in evolutionary biology. Major initiatives include the Generic Model Organism Database project, Dryad, and Phenoscape project.

== Education and outreach ==
NESCent’s science education and outreach group works to improve evolution education, expand opportunities for underrepresented groups, and communicate current and emerging research to the general public. Programs include professional development workshops for instructors at science and education conferences, annual Darwin Day festivities, working groups on evolution education, and monthly audio/video podcasts for the Evolution in the News program.

== Location and facilities ==
NESCent is located in the Erwin Mill Building, a former textile mill near Duke University’s main campus. NESCent’s facilities include four meeting rooms with space for up to 45 people, and a variety of offices for scientists and staff. The center is located at 2024 W. Main Street, Suite A200 Durham, NC 27705.
