= Data Infrastructure Building Blocks =

Data Infrastructure Building Blocks (DIBBs) is a U.S. National Science Foundation program.

On April 27, 2012, the U.S. National Science Foundation Office of Cyberinfrastructure announced a request for proposals with the name "Data Infrastructure Building Blocks (DIBBs)". The solicitation (NSF 12-557) "incorporated some but not all of the goals of the former DataNet and InterOp programs."

== Description ==
DIBBs is part of NSF's vision for a Cyberinfrastructure Framework for 21st Century Science (CIF21). The introduction in this solicitation states:

NSF's Cyberinfrastructure Framework for 21st Century Science and Engineering (CIF21) investment focuses on the interconnected cyberinfrastructure components necessary to realize the research potential of theoretical, experimental, observational and simulation-based research efforts.

The [DIBBs] Program Description describes the goals of the program as such:

. . . to support the development or expansion of new types of digital data storage, preservation, and access that: (1) enable engagement at the frontiers of science and engineering research and education; (2) work cooperatively and in coordination to overcome conventional barriers due to data type and format, discipline or subject area, and time and place to facilitate sharing of data; (3) combine expertise in cyberinfrastructure; library and archival sciences; computer, computational, and information sciences; and various domain sciences; (4) lead to long-term governance models for economic and technological sustainability over multiple decades.

== DIBBs Award Tracks ==
The solicitation divided the DIBBs awards into three areas: Conceptualization, Implementation, and Interoperability. These three tracks were distinguished as follows:

=== Conceptualization Awards ===
. . . planning awards aimed at further defining disciplinary and interdisciplinary communities' data storage and management requirements.

=== Implementation Awards ===
. . .will support development and implementation of technologies related to the data preservation and access lifecycle, including acquisition; documentation; security and integrity; storage; access, analysis and dissemination; migration; and deaccession. Implementation awards must also address how they will relate to and support other CIF21 components essential to the given community .

=== Interoperability Awards ===
. . .support community efforts to provide broad interoperability of datasets, enhancing interaction and information sharing to benefit all areas of NSF-funded science, engineering and education.

== Anticipated Grant Funding ==
The anticipated funding amount for this solicitation was listed at $41,500,000 pending availability of funds. The anticipated average award size for conceptualization awards was $100,000 for one year; for implementation awards was approximately $8 million total over 5 years; and for interoperability awards was estimated to be up to $1.5 million total over 3 years.

== Awards ==
Awards were given in two rounds. In the first round which dealt only with the Conceptualization track, for which full proposals were due on July 26, 2012, three DIBBs proposals were awarded:

- Conceptualization of the Social and Innovation Opportunities of Data Analysis, led by Michael Zentner at Purdue University
- Building International Data Sharing Capacity in Lake Sciences, with Implications for the Broader Environmental Science Community, led by Corinna Gries of the University of Wisconsin-Madison
- Designing the Roadmap for Social Network Data Management, led by Thomas Carsey of the University of North Carolina – Chapel Hill

The second round of awards covered the Implementation and Interoperability Tracks for which full proposals were due on August 30, 2012. Four more proposals were awarded:

- Long Term Access to Large Scientific Data Sets: The SkyServer and Beyond, led by Alexander Szalay of Johns Hopkins University
- The Data Exacell, led by Michael Levine of Carnegie-Mellon University
- Integrating Geospatial Capabilities into HUBzero, led by Xiaohui Carol Song of Purdue University
- Brown Dog, led by Kenton McHenry of the National Center for Supercomputing Applications (NCSA) at the University of Illinois at Urbana-Champaign

A total of about $26.8M was distributed among these seven awards.
