= Registry of Research Data Repositories =

German open science portal listing

re3data.org
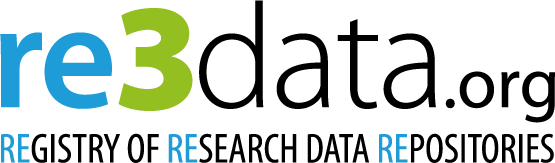
- The logo of re3data.org, the online Registry of Research Data Repositories
- Website type: Online registry
- Available in: English
- Website: www.re3data.org
- Commercial: no
- Registration: none
- Launched: 2012; 14 years ago
- Current status: Online
- Content license: Website: CC-BY, Database: CC0

The Registry of Research Data Repositories (re3data.org) is an open science tool that offers researchers, funding organizations, libraries, and publishers an overview of existing international repositories for research data.

== Background ==
re3data.org is a global registry of research data repositories from all academic disciplines. It provides an overview of existing research data repositories in order to help researchers to identify a suitable repository for their data and thus comply with requirements set out in data policies. The registry went live in autumn 2012.

== Content ==
In 2023, the registry lists over 3000 research data repositories from around the world covering all academic disciplines. They are described in detail using the re3data.org schema. The service makes all metadata in the registry available for open use under the Creative Commons deed CC0.

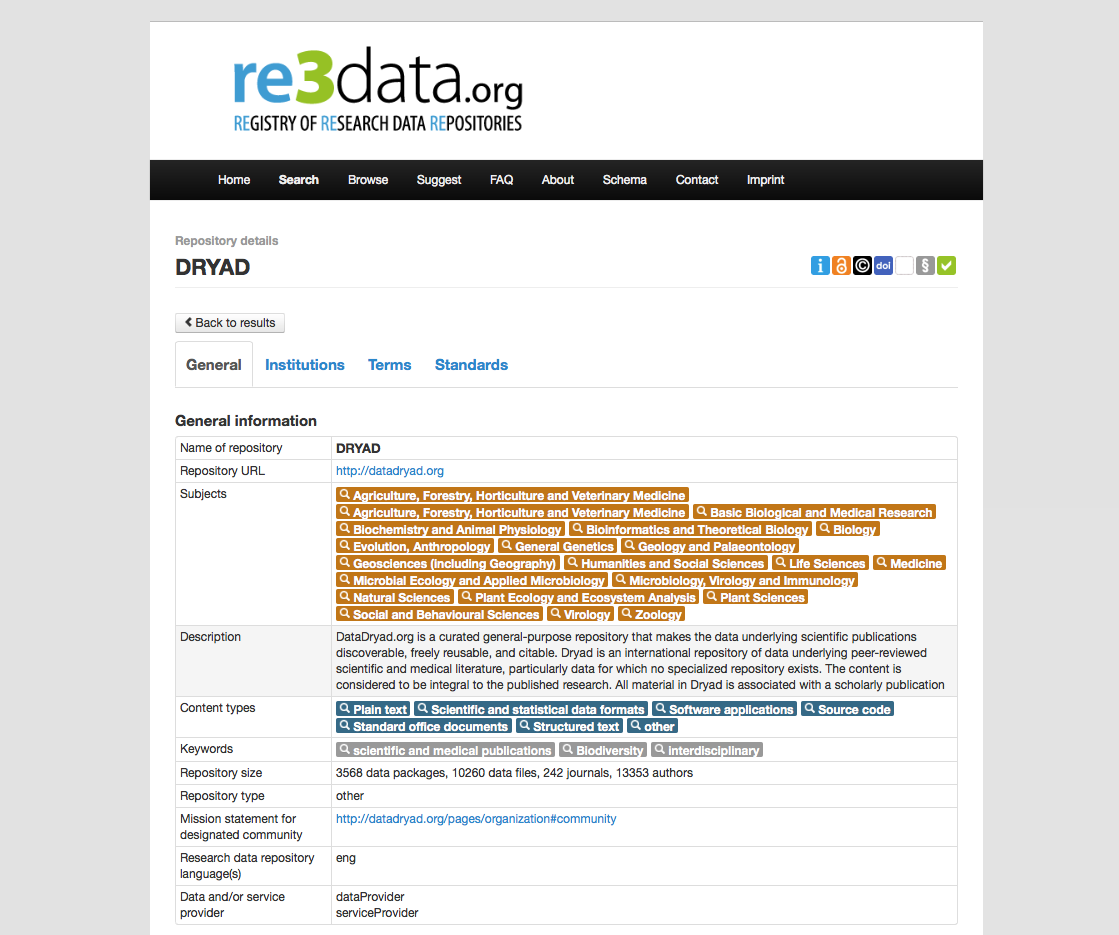
A screenshot of the DataDryad entry in re3data.org.

== Features ==
The majority of the listed research data repositories are described in detail by a comprehensive schema, namely the re3data.org Schema for the Description of Research Data Repositories. Information icons support researchers to identify an adequate repository for the storage and reuse of their data.

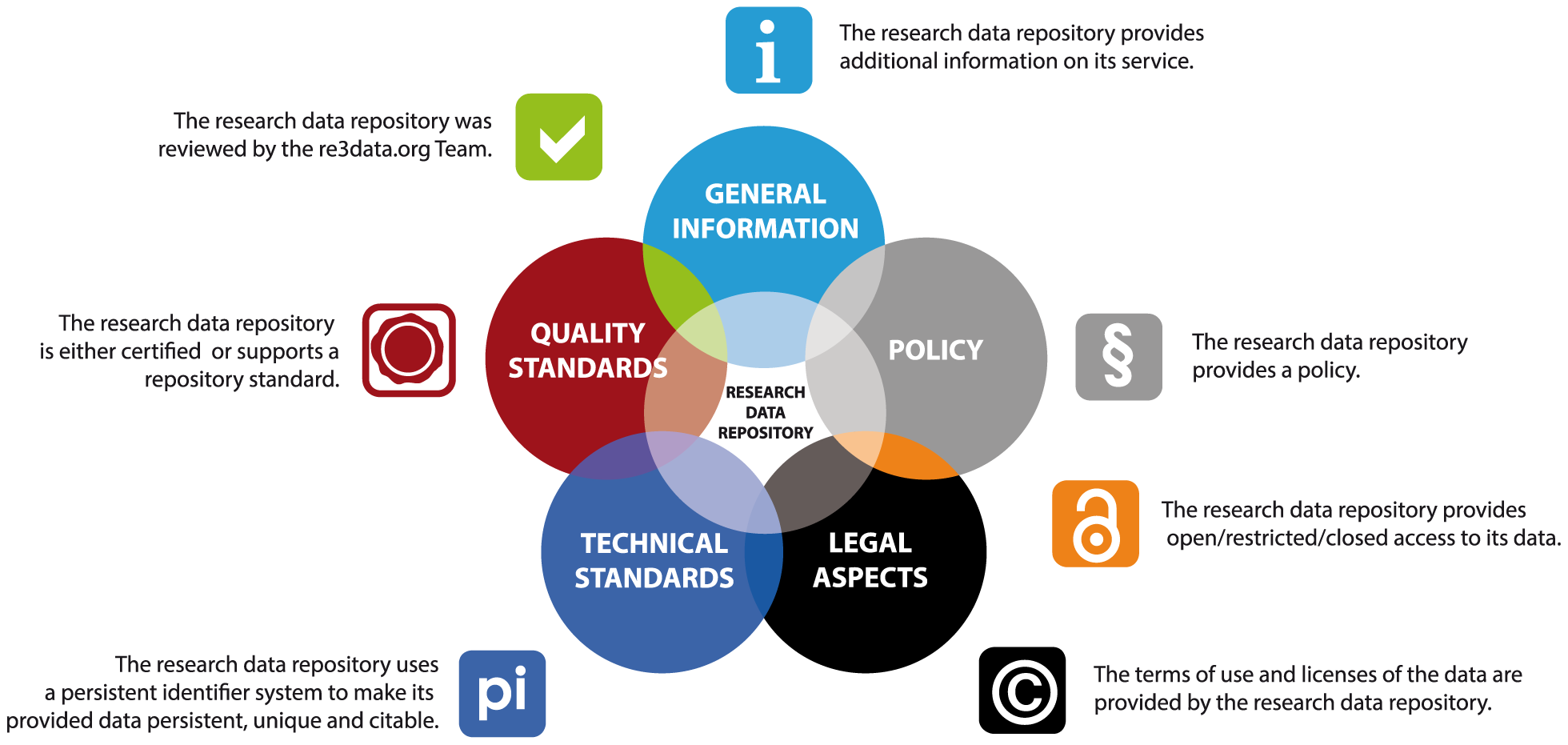
Aspects of a Research Data Repository with the corresponding icons used in re3data.org.

== Inclusion criteria ==
A repository is indexed when the minimum requirements for inclusion in re3data.org are met: the repository has to be run by a legal entity, such as a sustainable institution (e.g., library, university) and clearly state access conditions to the data and repository as well as the terms of use. Additionally, an English graphical user interface (GUI) plus a focus on research data is needed.

== Partners and cooperation ==
re3data.org was initiated as a joint project funded by the German Research Foundation (DFG). Current partners in re3data are DataCite, the Berlin School of Library and Information Science at the Humboldt-Universität zu Berlin, the Helmholtz Open Science Office of the Helmholtz Association, the KIT Library at the Karlsruhe Institute of Technology (KIT) and the Libraries of the Purdue University.

Several publishers, research institutions and funders refer to re3data.org in their editorial policies and guidelines as a tool for the identification of suitable data repositories, such as Springer Nature the European Commission or the National Science Foundation (NSF).

== See also ==
- Data curation
- Data sharing
- Scientific data archiving
