= ESO/ST-ECF Science Archive Facility =

Electronic archive of astronomical data

The ESO/ST-ECF Science Archive Facility is an electronic archive for astronomical data. It currently contains more than 40.0 Terabytes of scientific data obtained with the ESA/NASA Hubble Space Telescope (HST), with the ESO New Technology Telescope (NTT) and Very Large Telescope (VLT) and with the Wide Field Imager on the ESO/MPI 2.2m Telescope.
