= NCSA Brown Dog =

NCSA Brown Dog is a research project to develop a method for easily accessing historic research data stored in order to maintain the long-term viability of large bodies of scientific research. It is supported by the National Center for Supercomputing Applications (NCSA) that is funded by the National Science Foundation (NSF).

== History ==
Brown Dog is part of the DataNet partners program funded by NSF in 2008. DataNet was conceived to address the increasingly digital and data-intensive nature of science, engineering and education. Brown Dog is part of a follow-on effort called Data Infrastructure Building Blocks (DIBBs), focused on building software to support DataNet. The project was proposed by researchers at NCSA and the University of Illinois Urbana-Champaign as well as researchers from Boston University and the University of North Carolina at Chapel Hill.

== Unstructured, uncurated, long tail data ==
Much scientific data is smaller, unstructured and uncurated and thus not easily shared. Such data is sometimes referred to as "long tail" data. This borrows a term from statistics and refers to the tail of the distribution of project sizes. The majority of smaller projects lack the resources to properly steward the data they produce. This so-called "long tail" data, both past and present, has the potential to inform future research in many study areas. Much of this data has become inaccessible due to obsolete software and file formats. The resulting impossibility of reviewing data from older research disrupts the overall scientific research project.

== Approach ==
Brown Dog describes itself as the "super mutt" of software (thus the name "Brown Dog"), serving as a low-level data infrastructure to interface digital data content across the internet. Its approach is to use every possible source of automated help (i.e., software) in existence in a robust and provenance-preserving manner to create a service that can deal with as much of this data as possible. The project sees the broader impact of its work in its potential to serve the general public as a sort of "DNS for data", with the goal of making all data and all file formats as accessible as webpages are today.

== Technology ==
Brown Dog seeks to address problems involving the use of uncurated and unstructured data collections through the development of two services: the Data Access Proxy (DAP) to aid in the conversion of file formats and the Data Tilling Services (DTS) for the automatic extraction of metadata from file contents. Once developed, researchers and general public users will be able to download browser plugins and other tools from the Brown Dog tool catalog.

=== Data Tilling Service ===
Data Tilling Service (DTS) will allow users to search data collections using an existing file to discover other similar files in a collection. A DTS search field will be appended to configured browsers where example files can be dropped. This tells DTS to search all the files under a given URL for files similar to the dropped file. For example, while browsing an online image collection, a user could drop an image of three people into the search field, and the DTS would return all images in the collection that also contain three people. If DTS encounters a foreign file format, it will utilize DAP to make the file accessible. DTS also indexes the data and extract and appends metadata to files and collections enabling users to gain some sense of the type of data they are encountering.

This service runs on port 9443.

=== Data Access Proxy ===
Data Access Proxy (DAP) allows users to access data files that would otherwise be unreadable. Similar to an internet gateway or Domain Name Service, the DAP configuration would be entered into a user's machine and browser settings. Data requests over HTTP would first be examined by DAP to determine if the native file format is readable on the client device. If not, DAP converts the file into the best available format readable by the client machine. Alternatively, the user could specify the desired format themselves.

This service runs on port 8184.

== Use cases ==
Brown Dog targets three use cases proposed by groups within the EarthCube research communities. Developers and researchers from these communities will work together on use cases that span geoscience, engineering, biology and social science.

=== Long tail vegetation data in ecology and global change biology ===
This use case is led by Michael Dietze, Boston University

Data on the abundance, species composition, and size structure of vegetation is critically important for a wide array of sub-disciplines in ecology, conservation, natural resource management, and global change biology. However, addressing many of the pressing questions in these disciplines will require that terrestrial biosphere and hydrologic models are able to assimilate the large amount of long-tail data that exists but is largely inaccessible. The Brown Dog team in cooperation with researches from Dietze's lab will facilitate the capture of a huge body of smaller research-oriented vegetation data sets collected over many decades and historical vegetation data embedded in Public Land Survey data dating back to 1785. This data will be used as initial conditions for models, to make sense of other large data sets and for model calibration and validation.

=== Designing green infrastructure considering storm water and human requirements ===
This use case is led by Barbara Minsker], University of Illinois at Urbana-Champaign]; William Sullivan, University of Illinois at Urbana-Champaign; Arthur Schmidt, University of Illinois at Urbana-Champaign.

This case study involves developing novel green infrastructure design criteria and models that integrate requirements for storm water management and ecosystem and human health and well being. To address the scientific and social problems associated with the design of green spaces, data accessibility and availability is a major challenge. This study will focus on identified areas of the Green Healthy Neighborhood Planning region within the City of Chicago where existing local sewer performance is most deficient and where changes in impervious area through green infrastructure would be beneficial to under served neighborhoods. Brown Dog will be used to extract long-tail experimental data on human landscape preferences and health impacts. This data will be used to develop a human health impacts model that will then be linked together with a terrestrial biosphere model and a storm water model using Brown Dog technology.

=== Development and application for critical zone studies ===
This use case is led by Praveen Kumar, University of Illinois at Urbana-Champaign

Critical Zone (CZ) is the "skin" of the earth that extends from the treetops to the bedrock that is created by life processes working at scales from microbes to biomes. The Critical Zone supports all terrestrial living systems. Its upper part is the bio-mantle. This is where terrestrial biota live, reproduce, use and expend energy, and where their wastes and remains accumulate and decompose. It encompasses the soil, which acts as a geomembrane through which water and solutes, energy, gases, solids, and organisms interact with the atmosphere, biosphere, hydrosphere, and lithosphere. A variety of drivers affect this bio-dynamic zone, ranging from climate and deforestation to agriculture, grazing and human development. Understanding and predicting these effects is central to managing and sustaining vital ecosystem services such as soil fertility, water purification, and production of food resources, and, at larger scales, global carbon cycling and carbon sequestration. The CZ provides a unifying framework for integrating terrestrial surface and near-surface environments, and reflects an intricate web of biological and chemical processes and human impacts occurring at vastly different temporal and spatial scales. The nature of these data create significant challenges for inter-disciplinary studies of the CZ because integration of the variety and number of data products and models has been a barrier. On the other hand, CZ data provides an excellent opportunity for defining, testing and implementing Brown Dog technologies. In this context "unstructured" data is viewed broadly as consisting of a collection of heterogeneous data with formats that reflect temporal and disciplinary legacies, data from emerging low cost open hardware based sensors and embedded sensor networks that lack well defined metadata and sensor characteristics, as well as data that are available as maps, images and text.

== NSF Award ==
CIF21 DIBBs: Brown Dog was awarded in the winter of 2013 with a start date of October 1, 2013. Estimated expiration date is September 30, 2018.

The award amount was $10,519,716.00, the largest DIBB award. The principal investigator is Kenton McHenry of NCSA at the University of Illinois at Urbana-Champaign. Coleaders are Jong Lee NCSA/UIUC; Barbara Minsker, Civil and Environmental Engineering, University of Illinois at Urbana-Champaign; Praveen Kumar, Civil and Environmental Engineering, University of Illinois at Urbana-Champaign; Michael Dietze, Department of Earth and Environment, Boston University.
