= Monthly Climatic Data for the World =

Monthly publication of climate data by NOAA

Monthly Climatic Data for the World (MCDW) is a monthly publication of the National Climatic Data Center (NCDC) division of the National Environmental Satellite, Data, and Information Service (NESDIS) division of the National Oceanic and Atmospheric Administration (NOAA) of the United States. According to the website, each monthly issue "contains monthly mean temperature, pressure, precipitation, vapor pressure, and sunshine for approximately 2,000 surface data collection stations worldwide and monthly mean upper air temperatures, dew point depressions, and wind velocities for approximately 500 observing sites. This is the final quality controlled copy and generally has a 4 - 6 month time lag."

The issues are available for download in portable document format.

== Reception ==
MCDW data is recommended as a data source by libraries and other information providers, such as the University of Chicago Library. Other publications, including annual regional climate data publications, have also cited and used MCDW data.

Academic research in meteorology has often cited MCDW data.
