= Pythagoras Award =

Scientific award by the Ministry of Science and Education of Bulgaria

The Pythagoras Prize
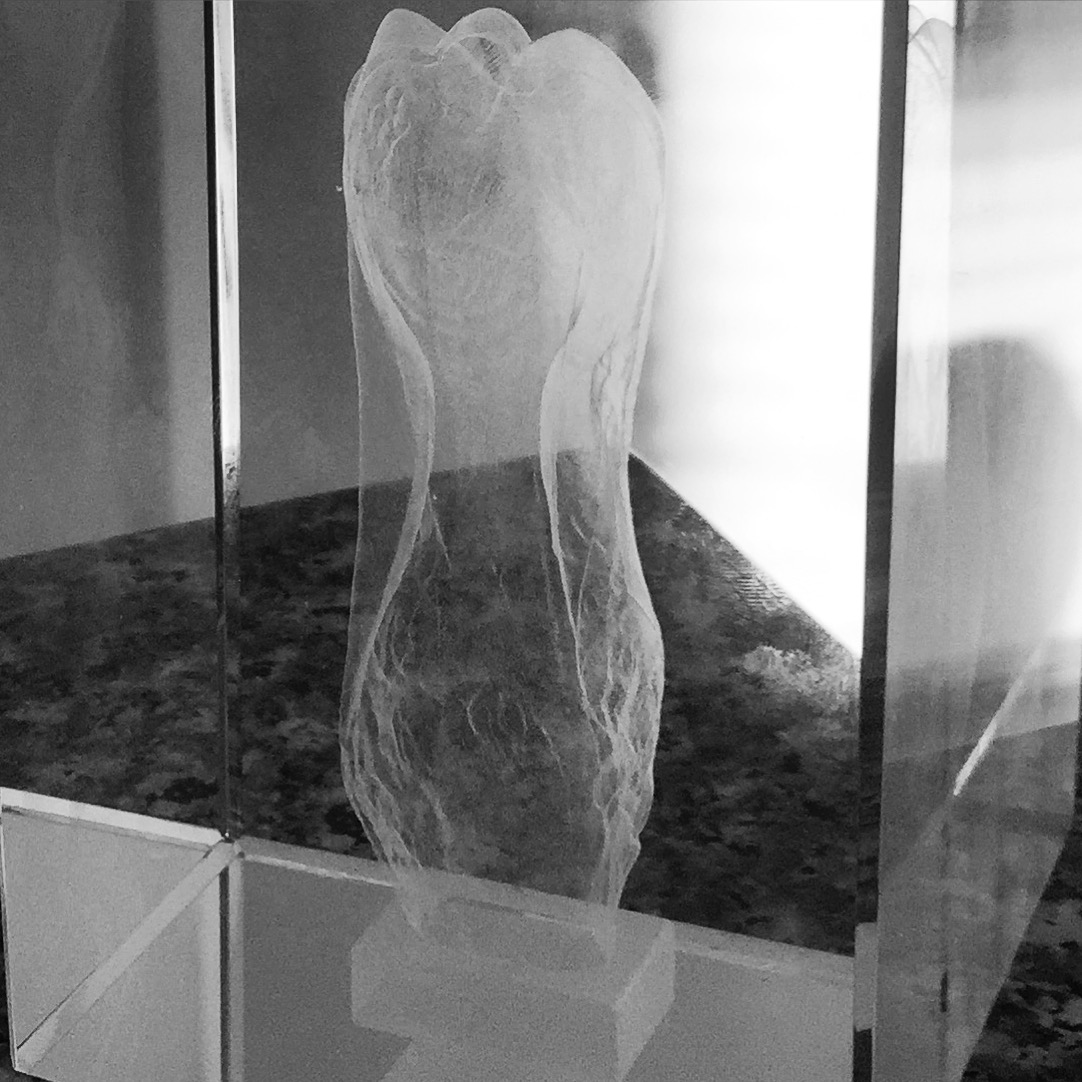
- Awarded for: Outstanding contributions in Science. Awarded annually.
- Date: May 24, 2009
- Location: Sofia, Bulgaria
- Presented by: Ministry of Science and Education of Bulgaria
- First award: 2009

The Pythagoras Award, or The Pythagoras Prize, or The Pitagor Prize (named after Pythagoras - a Greek philosopher, mathematician and scientist, Bulgarian: Награда Питагор), established in 2008, is an award given annually to Bulgarian nationals by the Ministry of Science and Education of Bulgaria in recognition for outstanding scientific achievements.

The Pythagoras Prizes are the most prestigious Scientific awards in Bulgaria, frequently referred as the Bulgarian Nobel Prizes. There are several categories each with its own award. The Pythagoras statuettes symbolize The Third Eye which provides perception beyond ordinary sight. The statuettes are designed by the famous Bulgarian sculptor Georgi Chapkanov.

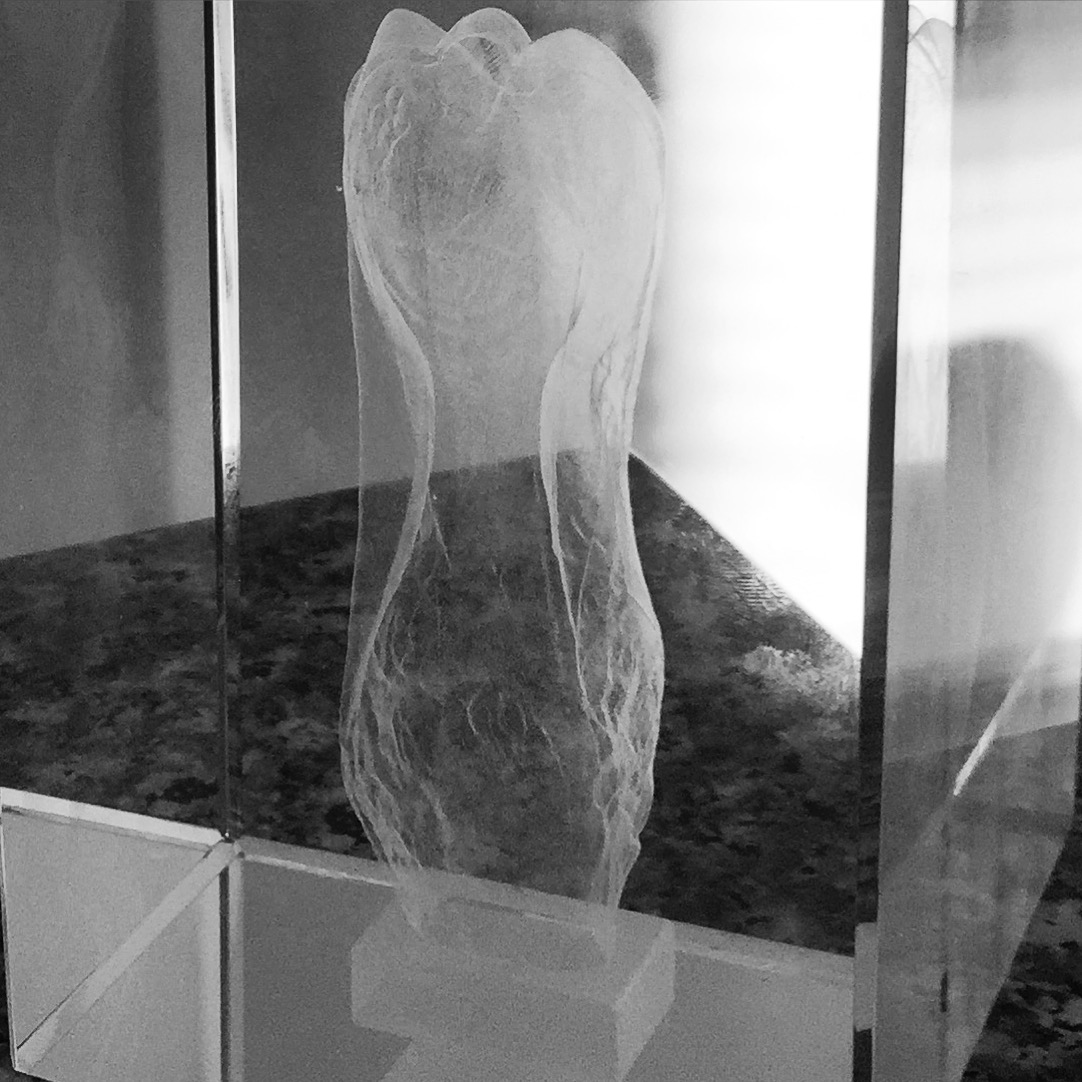
Pythagoras Statuette - a laser hologram of a statuette symbolizing The Third Eye (the top front area of the sculpture), providing perception beyond ordinary sight.

== Categories ==
1. Pythagoras Grand Prize for Seminal Contribution to Advancement of Science

2. Pythagoras Grand Prize for Principal Investigator of International Synergy Project

3. Pythagoras Grand Prize for Young Scientist

4. Pythagoras Prize for Distinguished Scientist in Natural Science and Engineering

5. Pythagoras Prize for Distinguished Scientist in Physiology and Medicine

6. Pythagoras Prize for Distinguished Scientist in Humanities and Social Science

7. Pythagoras Prize for Bulgarian Scientist abroad for Seminal Contribution to Science

8. Pythagoras Prize for Scientific Team with Successful Commercialization of Scientific Results

9. Pythagoras Prize for Scientific Book

10. Pythagoras Prize for Company with the Largest Endowment to Science

== Recipients ==
Year 2016

Prof. Elka Bakalova

Prof. Peter Kralchevski

Dr. Antonia Toncheva

Prof. Vladimir Bozhinov

Prof. Irini Doichinova

Prof. Ivaylo Turnev

Prof. Veselin Petrov

Dr. Aleksander Kumurdzhiev

Prof. Nikolay Nihrizov

Dr. Milen Vrabevski

Prof. Tenio Popmintchev

Year 2014

Prof. Plamen Ch. Ivanov
