= National Climatic Data Center =

Active US archive of weather data

Agency overview
- Formed: 1934
- Dissolved: 2015
- Superseding agency: National Centers for Environmental Information
- Jurisdiction: United States government
- Headquarters: Asheville, North Carolina
- Annual budget: $65 million (2013)
- Agency executive: Thomas R. Karl, Director
- Website: ncdc.noaa.gov

The United States National Climatic Data Center (NCDC), previously known as the National Weather Records Center (NWRC), in Asheville, North Carolina, was the world's largest active archive of weather data.

In 2015, the NCDC merged with two other federal environmental records agencies to become the National Centers for Environmental Information (NCEI).

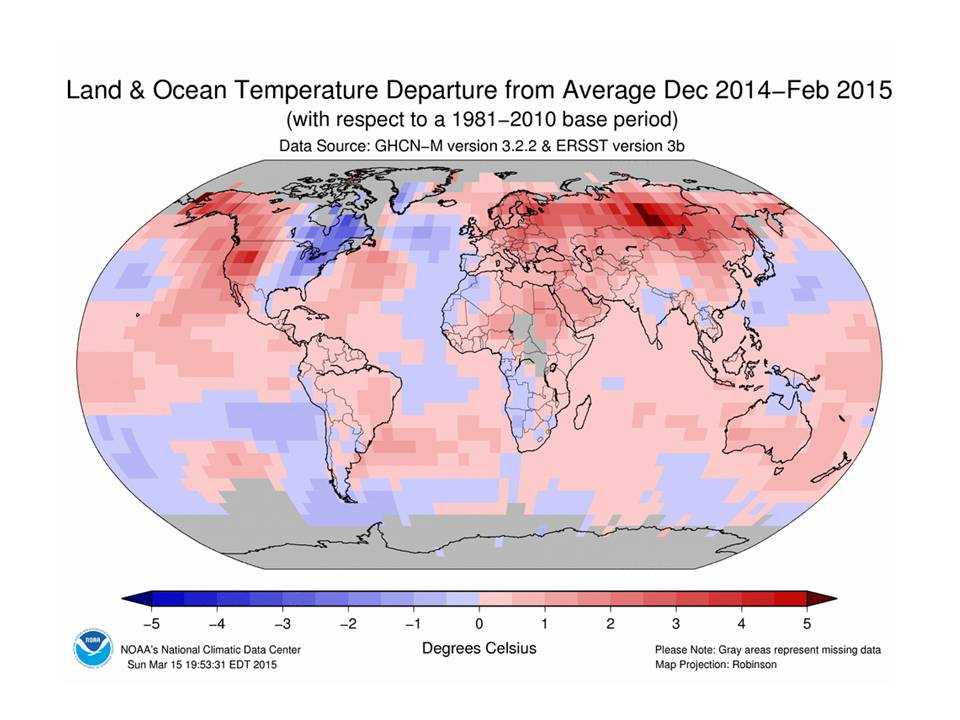
Courtesy of: National Climatic Data Center, National Oceanic Atmospheric Administration, February 2015.

== History ==
In 1934, the U.S. government established a tabulation unit in New Orleans, Louisiana, to process weather records. Climate records and upper air observations were punched onto cards in 1936. This organization was transferred to Asheville, North Carolina, in 1951, where the National Weather Records Center (NWRC). It was housed in the Grove Arcade Building in Asheville, North Carolina.

Processing of the climate data was accomplished at Weather Records Processing Centers at Chattanooga, Tennessee; Kansas City, Missouri; and San Francisco, California, until January 1, 1963, when it was consolidated with the NWRC.

In 1967, the agency was renamed the National Climatic Data Center.

In 1995, the NCDC moved into the newly completed Veach-Baley Federal Complex in downtown Asheville.

In 2015, the NCDC merged with the National Geophysical Data Center and the National Oceanographic Data Center to become the National Centers for Environmental Information (NCEI).

== Sources ==
Data were received from a wide variety of sources, including weather satellites, radar, automated airport weather stations, National Weather Service (NWS) Cooperative Observers, aircraft, ships, radiosondes, wind profilers, rocketsondes, solar radiation networks, and NWS Forecast/Warnings/Analyses Products.

== Climate focus ==
The Center provided historical perspectives on climate which were vital to studies on global climate change, the greenhouse effect, and other environmental issues. The Center stored information essential to industry, agriculture, science, hydrology, transportation, recreation, and engineering. These services are still provided by the NCEI.

The NCDC said:

Evidence is mounting that global climate is changing. While it is generally accepted that humans are negatively influencing the climate, the extent to which humans are responsible is still under study. Regardless of the causes, it is essential that a baseline of long-term climate data be compiled; therefore, global data must be acquired, quality controlled, and archived. Working with international institutions such as the International Council of Scientific Unions, the World Data Centers, and the World Meteorological Organization, NCDC develops standards by which data can be exchanged and made accessible.

NCDC provides the historical perspective on climate. Through the use of over a hundred years of weather observations, reference data bases are generated. From this knowledge the clientele of NCDC can learn from the past to prepare for a better tomorrow. Wise use of our most valuable natural resource, climate, is the goal of climate researchers, state and regional climate centers, business, and commerce.

== Associated entities ==
NCDC also maintained World Data Center for Meteorology, Asheville. The four World Centers (U.S., Russia, Japan and China) have created a free and open situation in which data and dialogue are exchanged.

NCDC maintained the U.S. Climate Reference Network datasets and a vast number of other climate monitoring products.

== See also ==
- Climate Prediction Center
- Environmental data rescue
- Monthly Climatic Data for the World
- National Severe Storms Laboratory
- NOAA National Operational Model Archive and Distribution System (NOMADS)
- State of the Climate
- Storm Prediction Center
