= Data sharing =

Research dataset dissemination to enable access/use by investigators

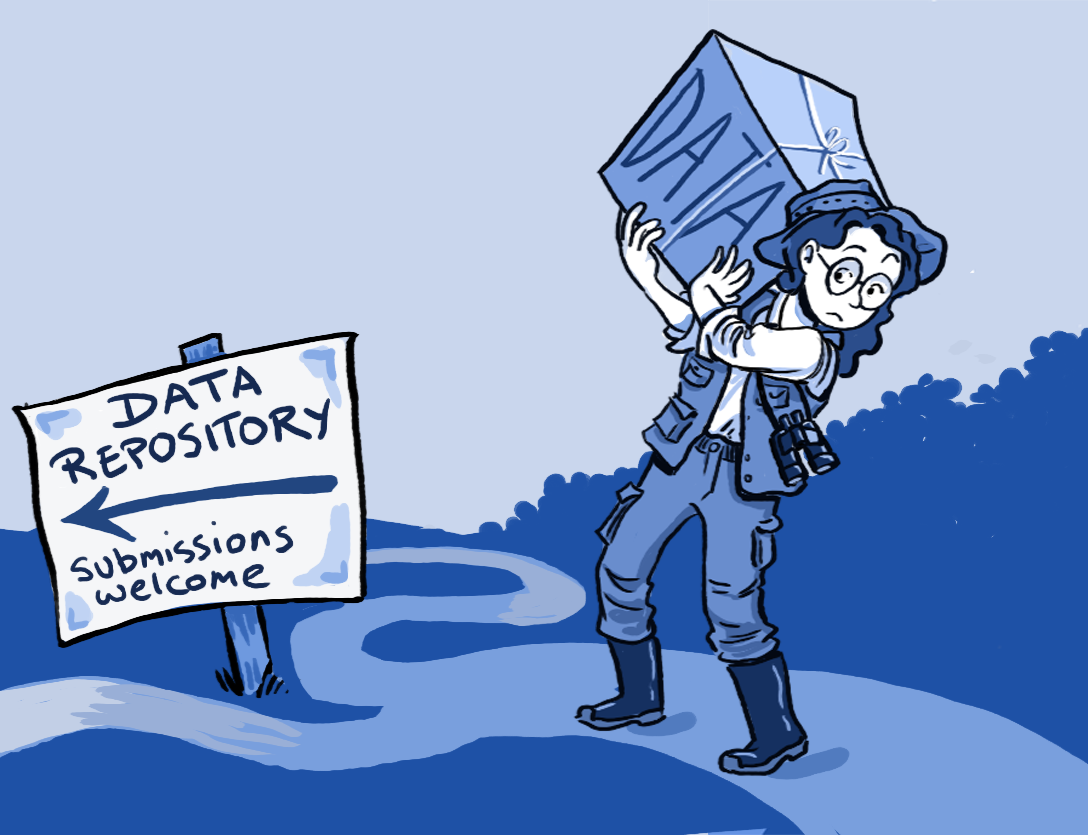
The decision whether and how to share data often rests with researchers.

Data sharing denotes the dissemination of research datasets to enable access and use by other investigators. Policies governing this practice are increasingly instituted by funding agencies, academic institutions, and scholarly journals, reflecting the consensus that transparency and openness constitute foundational principles of the scientific method.

A number of funding agencies and science journals require authors of peer-reviewed papers to share any supplemental information (raw data, statistical methods or source code) necessary to understand, develop or reproduce published research. A great deal of scientific research is not subject to data sharing requirements, and many of these policies have liberal exceptions. In the absence of any binding requirement, data sharing is at the discretion of the scientists themselves. In addition, in certain situations governments and institutions prohibit or severely limit data sharing to protect proprietary interests, national security, and subject/patient/victim confidentiality. Data sharing may also be restricted to protect institutions and scientists from use of data for political purposes.

Data and methods may be requested from an author years after publication. In order to encourage data sharing and prevent the loss or corruption of data, a number of funding agencies and journals established policies on data archiving. Access to publicly archived data is a recent development in the history of science made possible by technological advances in communications and information technology. To take full advantage of modern rapid communication may require consensual agreement on the criteria underlying mutual recognition of respective contributions. Models recognized for the timely sharing of data for more effective response to emergent infectious disease threats include the data sharing mechanism introduced by the GISAID Initiative.

Despite policies on data sharing and archiving, data withholding still happens. Authors may fail to archive data or they only archive a portion of the data. Failure to archive data alone is not data withholding. When a researcher requests additional information, an author sometimes refuses to provide it. When authors withhold data like this, they run the risk of losing the trust of the science community. A 2022 study identified about 3500 research papers which contained statements that the data was available, but upon request and further seeking the data, found that it was unavailable for 94% of papers.

Data sharing may also indicate the sharing of personal information on a social media platform.

== U.S. government policies ==
=== Federal law ===
On August 9, 2007, President Bush signed the America COMPETES Act (or the "America Creating Opportunities to Meaningfully Promote Excellence in Technology, Education, and Science Act") requiring civilian federal agencies to provide guidelines, policies and procedures, to facilitate and optimize the open exchange of data and research between agencies, the public and policymakers. See Section 1009.

=== NIH data sharing policy ===
'The National Institutes of Health (NIH) Grants Policy Statement defines "data" as "recorded information, regardless of the form or medium on which it may be recorded, and includes writings, films, sound recordings, pictorial reproductions, drawings, designs, or other graphic representations, procedural manuals, forms, diagrams, work flow charts, equipment descriptions, data files, data processing or computer programs (software), statistical records, and other research data."'

— Council on Governmental Relations

The NIH Final Statement of Sharing of Research Data says:

'NIH reaffirms its support for the concept of data sharing. We believe that data sharing is essential for expedited translation of research results into knowledge, products, and procedures to improve human health. The NIH endorses the sharing of final research data to serve these and other important scientific goals. The NIH expects and supports the timely release and sharing of final research data from NIH-supported studies for use by other researchers. 'NIH recognizes that the investigators who collect the data have a legitimate interest in benefiting from their investment of time and effort. We have therefore revised our definition of "the timely release and sharing" to be no later than the acceptance for publication of the main findings from the final data set. NIH continues to expect that the initial investigators may benefit from first and continuing use but not from prolonged exclusive use.'

— 'Final NIH statement on sharing research data.'

=== NSF Policy from Grant General Conditions ===
36. Sharing of Findings, Data, and Other Research Products

a. NSF …expects investigators to share with other researchers, at no more than incremental cost and within a reasonable time, the data, samples, physical collections and other supporting materials created or gathered in the course of the work. It also encourages awardees to share software and inventions or otherwise act to make the innovations they embody widely useful and usable.

b. Adjustments and, where essential, exceptions may be allowed to safeguard the rights of individuals and subjects, the validity of results, or the integrity of collections or to accommodate legitimate interests of investigators.

— "National Science Foundation: Grant General Conditions (GC-1)", April 1, 2001 (p. 17).

== Office of Research Integrity ==
Allegations of misconduct in medical research carry severe consequences. The United States Department of Health and Human Services established an office to oversee investigations of allegations of misconduct, including data withholding. The website defines the mission:

"The Office of Research Integrity (ORI) promotes integrity in biomedical and behavioral research supported by the U.S. Public Health Service (PHS) at about 4,000 institutions worldwide. ORI monitors institutional investigations of research misconduct and facilitates the responsible conduct of research (RCR) through educational, preventive, and regulatory activities."

— Office of Research Integrity.

== Ideals in data sharing ==
Some research organizations feel particularly strongly about data sharing. Stanford University's WaveLab has a philosophy about reproducible research and disclosing all algorithms and source code necessary to reproduce the research. In a paper titled "WaveLab and Reproducible Research," the authors describe some of the problems they encountered in trying to reproduce their own research after a period of time. In many cases, it was so difficult they gave up the effort. These experiences are what convinced them of the importance of disclosing source code. The philosophy is described:

The idea is: An article about computational science in a scientific publication is not the scholarship itself, it is merely advertising of the scholarship. The actual scholarship is the complete software development environment and the complete set of instructions which generated the figures.

The Data Observation Network for Earth (DataONE) and Data Conservancy are projects supported by the National Science Foundation to encourage and facilitate data sharing among research scientists and better support meta-analysis. In environmental sciences, the research community is recognizing that major scientific advances involving integration of knowledge in and across fields will require that researchers overcome not only the technological barriers to data sharing but also the historically entrenched institutional and sociological barriers. Dr. Richard J. Hodes, director of the National Institute on Aging has stated, "the old model in which researchers jealously guarded their data is no longer applicable".

The Alliance for Taxpayer Access is a group of organizations that support open access to government sponsored research. The group has expressed a "Statement of Principles" explaining why they believe open access is important. They also list a number of international public access policies. This is no more so than in timely communication of essential information to effectively respond to health emergencies. While public domain archives have been embraced for depositing data, mainly post formal publication, they have failed to encourage rapid data sharing during health emergencies, among them the Ebola and Zika, outbreaks. More clearly defined principles are required to recognize the interests of those generating the data while permitting free, unencumbered access to and use of the data (pre-publication) for research and practical application, such as those adopted by the GISAID Initiative to counter emergent threats from influenza.

== International policies ==
- Australia
- Austria
- Europe — Commission of European Communities
- Germany
- United Kingdom
- 'Omic Data Sharing — a list of policies of major science funders FAIRsharing.org Catalogue of Data Policies
- India -National Data Sharing and Accessibility Policy – Government of India

== Data sharing problems in academia ==
=== Genetics ===
Withholding of data has become so commonplace in genetics that researchers at Massachusetts General Hospital published a journal article on the subject. The study found that "Because they were denied access to data, 28% of geneticists reported that they had been unable to confirm published research."

=== Psychology ===
In a 2006 study, it was observed that, of 141 authors of a publication from the American Psychological Association (APA) empirical articles, 103 (73%) did not respond with their data over a 6-month period. In a follow-up study published in 2015, it was found that 246 out of 394 contacted authors of papers in APA journals did not share their data upon request (62%).

=== Archaeology ===
A 2018 study reported on study of a random sample of 48 articles published during February–May 2017 in the Journal of Archaeological Science which found openly available raw data for 18 papers (53%), with compositional and dating data being the most frequently shared types. The same study also emailed authors of articles on experiments with stone artifacts that were published during 2009 and 2015 to request data relating to the publications. They contacted the authors of 23 articles and received 15 replies, resulting in a 70% response rate. They received five responses that included data files, giving an overall sharing rate of 20%.

=== Scientists in training ===
A study of scientists in training indicated many had already experienced data withholding. This study has given rise to the fear the future generation of scientists will not abide by best practices.

== Differing approaches in different fields ==
Requirements for the sharing of data are more frequently mandated within the medical and biological sciences than within the physical sciences. These requirements differ considerably in terms of whether data must be shared at all, the parties with whom data must be shared, and the responsibility for covering the costs associated with sharing.

Funding bodies such as the National Institutes of Health and the National Science Foundation generally impose stronger expectations for data sharing. However, even these policies acknowledge important considerations, including the protection of patient confidentiality, the financial burden of data dissemination, and the legitimacy of the request for access. Private interests and public agencies with national security interests (defense and law enforcement) often discourage sharing of data and methods through non-disclosure agreements.

Data sharing poses specific challenges in participatory monitoring initiatives, for example where forest communities collect data on local social and environmental conditions. In this case, a rights-based approach to the development of data-sharing protocols can be based on principles of free, prior and informed consent, and prioritise the protection of the rights of those who generated the data, and/or those potentially affected by data-sharing.

== See also ==
- Data archive
- Data dissemination
- Data privacy
- Data publishing
- Data citation
- FAIR data
- File sharing
- Information sharing
- Knowledge sharing
- Open data
- Registry of Research Data Repositories

== Literature ==
Committee on Issues in the Transborder Flow of Scientific Data, National Research Council (1997). Bits of Power: Issues in Global Access to Scientific Data. Washington, D.C.: National Academy Press. doi:10.17226/5504. ISBN 978-0-309-05635-9. — discusses the international exchange of data in the natural sciences.
