= Data refuge =

Data Refuge is a public and collaborative project designed to address concerns about federal climate and environmental data that is in danger of being lost. In particular, the initiative addresses five main concerns:

- What are the best ways to safeguard data?
- How do federal agencies play a crucial role in collecting, managing, and distributing data?
- How do government priorities impact data's accessibility?
- Which projects and research fields depend on federal data?
- Which data sets are of value to research and local communities, and why?

Data Refuge began as a grassroots organization in opposition to government data on climate change and the environment not being archived systemically. Data Refuge's main goal is to collect and allocate data in multiple safe locations to create a sustainable way of archiving old and new data.

Data Refuge was initiated in 2016 to protect federal climate and environmental data that is vulnerable under an administration that denies climate change. The system aims to make public research-quality copies of federal climate and environmental data. Data Refuge is supported by the National Geographic Foundation, private donors, Libraries+ Network, Preserving Electronic Governance Initiative (PEGI), the Union of Concerned Scientists (USC), and the Penn Program in Environmental Humanities (PPEH).

== Types of data ==
Data Refuge collects public federal data on the climate and environment in the form of satellite imagery, PDFs, and stories.

The data are stored in multiple trusted locations as they are less vulnerable if in only one location, and to ensure accessibility for researchers. Through the Data Rescue events, Data Refuge has accumulated 4 terabytes of data, 30,000 URLs, and 800 participants.

=== Storytelling ===
Data Refuge collects stories on vulnerable federal climate and environmental data through: surveys, oral history, photo essays, maps, video shorts, and animations. The stories are archived in a public bank that showcase how federal environmental data support health and safety in communities. Data Stories are collected at Data Rescue events, which are partnered with universities, city and town halls, and advocacy groups.

Data stories are collected and used to emphasize the importance of Data Refuge, in how the data on climate change and the environment are being used by people in the United States and across the world for meaningful practices.
