= Data dissemination =

Data dissemination is the distribution or transmitting of statistical, or other, data to end users. There are many ways organizations can release data to the public, i.e. electronic format, CD-ROM and paper publications such as PDF files based on aggregated data. The most popular dissemination method today is the ‘non-proprietary’ open systems using internet protocols. Data is made available in common open formats.

Some organizations choose to disseminate data using ‘proprietary’ databases in order to protect their sovereignty and copyright of the data. Proprietary data dissemination requires a specific piece of software in order for end users to view the data. The data will not open in common open formats. The data is first converted into the proprietary data format, and specifically designed software is provided by the organization to users.

== Dissemination formats and standards ==
Under the Special Data Dissemination Standard, the formats are divided into two categories: "hardcopy" and "electronic" publications

Some examples of Hardcopy publications:

- yearbook
- panorama of municipalities
- monthly review
- trends
- pocketbook
- periodical

Some examples of electronic copy publications:

- CD Rom
- Webpage
- PDF
- Downloadable Databases for private use in 3rd party software applications

== Standards ==
Standards have been developed in order to provide an internationally accepted statistical methodology for the dissemination of statistical data. The ‘International Organization for Standardization’ (ISO) are one such international standard-setting body made up of representatives from various national standards organizations. They created the SDMX standard widely used around the world. SDMX stands for ‘Statistical Data and Metadata Exchange’. It is commonly used in national and international statistical and economic data sharing systems. This standard is for the exchange of essential social and economic statistics, for example between European national agencies and Eurostat and the European Central Bank. SDMX is used for the dissemination of multi-dimensional aggregated data.

The Data Documentation Initiative (DDI) was created by the DDI Alliance. DDI is an open metadata specification and covers the full data life cycle from planning through to dissemination and archiving data. It is most popularly used for social statistics micro data but is not limited to this subject area. There are some examples online where these two standards are in use in proprietary data form.

== Some examples of proprietary data dissemination online ==
- Public Transport Victoria Online Portal
- Health Workforce Australia Online Portal
- Cancer Council Victoria Online Portal
- Catholic Education Office Canberra Online Portal
- Department of Workplace and Pensions UK Online Portal
- Australian Bureau of Statistics Table builder Table Builder Online Portal
- King Faisal Specialist Hospital Research Centre Online Portal
