= WaveLab (mathematics software) =

- Developer(s): WaveLab Development Team
- Stable release: 850
- Operating system: Cross-platform
- Website: www-stat.stanford.edu/~wavelab

WaveLab is a collection of MATLAB functions for wavelet analysis. Following the success of WaveLab package, there is now the availability of CurveLab and ShearLab.
