= DataONE =

International federation of data repositories

Content
- Description: DataONE, data on the Earth, Life, and the Environment
- Data types captured: Earth science, Ecology, Environmental Science, Social Science
- Organisms: all

Access
- Data format: Comma-separated values NetCDF; XML; Satellite imagery
- Website: DataONE
- Download URL: DataONE Search
- Web service URL: API

Tools
- Web: DataONE
- Standalone: dataone R package

Miscellaneous
- License: Various open data licenses
- Bookmarkable entities: yes

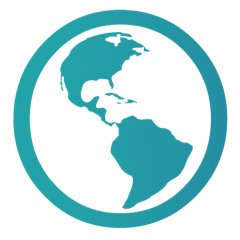
logo

DataONE is a network of interoperable data repositories facilitating data sharing, data discovery, and open science. Originally supported by $21.2 million in funding from the US National Science Foundation as one of the initial DataNet programs in 2009, funding was renewed in 2014 through 2020 with an additional $15 million. DataONE helps preserve, access, use, and reuse of multi-discipline scientific data through the construction of primary cyberinfrastructure and an education and outreach program. DataONE provides scientific data archiving for ecological and environmental data produced by scientists. DataONE's goal is to preserve and provide access to multi-scale, multi-discipline, and multi-national data. Users include scientists, ecosystem managers, policy makers, students, educators, librarians, and the public.

DataONE links together existing cyberinfrastructure to provide a distributed framework, management, and technologies that enable long-term preservation of multi-scale, multi-discipline, and multi-national observational data. The distributed framework is composed of Coordinating Nodes located at the Oak Ridge Campus at Tennessee, University of California Santa Barbara, and University of New Mexico, and member nodes. DataONE also provides resources including tools for accessing and using it.

== Coordinating nodes ==
The three coordinating nodes provide network-wide services to member nodes. They are geographically replicated, with mirrored content and full copies of science metadata. William Michener of the University of New Mexico (UNM) directed the project, and UNM is one of the coordinating nodes. Coordinating nodes are UNM, Oak Ridge Campus (partnership of Oak Ridge National Laboratory (ORNL) and University of Tennessee), and the University of California, Santa Barbara.

== Member nodes ==
Member nodes consist of Earth observing institutions, projects, and networks. They provide resources for their own data and replicated data, and focus on serving their specific constituencies. These member nodes are geographically distributed and include:

- Cornell Lab of Ornithology eBird
- Dryad
- Earth Data Analysis Center (EDAC)
- Environmental Data for the Oak Ridge Area (EDORA)
- Ecological Society of America (ESA) Data Registry
- Europe Long-Term Ecosystem Research Network (LTER Europe)
- Global Lake Ecological Observatory Network (GLEON)
- Gulf of Alaska Data Portal
- International Arctic Research Center (IARC) Data Archive
- Knowledge Network for Biocomplexity
- Long Term Ecological Research Network (LTER)
- Merritt Repository
- Minnesota Population Center (MPC)
- Montana IoE Data Repository
- Nevada Research Data Center
- New Mexico Experimental Program to Stimulate Competitive Research (NM EPSCoR)
- NOAA National Centers for Environmental Information (NCEI) Oceanographic Data Archive
- ONEShare Repository
- ORNL Distributed Active Archive Center
- Partnership for Interdisciplinary Studies of Coastal Oceans (PISCO)
- Program for Research on Biodiversity (PPPBio)
- Regional and Global Biogeochemical Dynamics Data (RGD)
- SANParks Data Repository
- SEAD Virtual Archive
- Taiwan Forestry Research Institute
- Terrestrial Ecosystem Research Network (TERN)
- University of Kansas - Biodiversity Institute
- USA National Phenology Network
- USGS Science Data Catalog (SDC)

== Investigator Tool Kit ==
The Tool Kit provides tools for researchers to access DataONE. These are both general purpose and discipline-specific tools, and developers adapt existing tools where possible. The tool kit includes Java and Python libraries, an R programming language plug-in for analysis, extensions for Excel, the VisTrails scientific workflow, and the Kepler scientific workflow system.

== Data management ==
DataONE provides a place for scientists to store data and its associated metadata. The metadata makes this data searchable and accessible to other scientists. Data management practices include

- Data management planning
- Data acquisition (techniques, protocols, methods)
- Data protection (backing up)
- Data entry and manipulation (naming files, organization) Matlab, R
- Quality control on data
- Data analysis
- Workflow tools (VisTrails, Kepler scientific workflow system)
- Data documentation (metadata)
- Data sharing, citation, and discovery
- Data preservation and curation

Some of the additional data management planning resources include: a primer for best practices, a database for best practices in data management, educational modules and tutorials, webinars, and an investigator toolkit. These have been used or adapted for use under Creative Commons license by organizations and institutions that seek to educate other communities about data and research management. Understanding different audiences of users led to the development of possible user personas as models for users such as early-career researchers, science data librarians, citizen scientists or K-12 educators.

== Collaborations ==
DataONE collaborates with other institutions to bring together tools that help with data management practices. One of those tools, developed in collaboration with other organizations and hosted by the University of California Digital Curation Center, is the DMPTool for data management planning. The DMP Tool is used by and referenced by many research data management plans and institutions in the US and around the world. Another recent collaboration in this area is the shared construction of a Data Management Training Clearinghouse for Earth sciences, in partnership with USGS and the Community for Data Integration (CDI).

== Community ==
The DataONE community includes research networks, professional societies, libraries, academic institutions, data centers, data repositories, environmental observatory networks, educators, scientists, policy makers, administrators, citizen scientists, international organizations, NGOs, ecosystem managers, students, private companies and the public. DataONE has a users group that meets yearly to provide feedback.
