= Datanet =

DataNet, or Sustainable Digital Data Preservation and Access Network Partner, was a research program of the U.S. National Science Foundation Office of Cyberinfrastructure. The office announced a request for proposals with this title on September 28, 2007. The lead paragraph of its synopsis describes the program as:

Science and engineering research and education are increasingly digital and increasingly data-intensive. Digital data are not only the output of research but provide input to new hypotheses, enabling new scientific insights and driving innovation. Therein lies one of the major challenges of this scientific generation: how to develop the new methods, management structures and technologies to manage the diversity, size, and complexity of current and future data sets and data streams. This solicitation addresses that challenge by creating a set of exemplar national and global data research infrastructure organizations (dubbed DataNet Partners) that provide unique opportunities to communities of researchers to advance science and/or engineering research and learning.

The introduction in the solicitation goes on to say:

Chapter 3 (Data, Data Analysis, and Visualization) of NSF’s Cyberinfrastructure Vision for 21st century Discovery presents a vision in which “science and engineering digital data are routinely deposited in well-documented form, are regularly and easily consulted and analyzed by specialists and non-specialists alike, are openly accessible while suitably protected, and are reliably preserved.” The goal of this solicitation is to catalyze the development of a system of science and engineering data collections that is open, extensible and evolvable.

The initial plan called for a $100 million initiative: five awards of $20 million each over five years with the possibility of continuing funding. Awards were given in two rounds. In the first round, for which full proposals were due on March 21, 2008, two DataNet proposals were awarded. DataONE, led by William Michener at the University of New Mexico covers ecology, evolutionary, and earth science. The Data Conservancy, led by Sayeed Choudhury of Johns Hopkins University, focuses on astronomy, earth science, life sciences, and social science.

For the second round, preliminary proposals were due on October 6, 2008, and full proposals on February 16, 2009. Awards from the second round were greatly delayed, and funding was reduced substantially from $20 million per project to $8 million. Funding for three second round projects began in Fall 2011. SEAD: Sustainable Environment through Actionable Data, led by Margaret Hedstrom of the University of Michigan, seeks to provide data curation software and services for the "long tail" of small- and medium-scale data producers in the domain of sustainability science. The DataNet Federation Consortium, led by Reagan Moore of the University of North Carolina, uses the integrated Rule-Oriented Data System (iRODS) to provide data grid infrastructure for science and engineering. Terra Populus, led by Steven Ruggles of the University of Minnesota focuses on tools for data integration across the domains of social science and environmental data, allowing interoperability of the three major data formats used in these domains: microdata, areal data, and raster data.

Some of its goals were later incorporated in the Data Infrastructure Building Blocks program.
