= National Oceanographic Data Center =

Former United States data centre

The National Oceanographic Data Center (NODC) was one of the national environmental data centers operated by the National Oceanic and Atmospheric Administration (NOAA) of the U.S. Department of Commerce. The main NODC facility was located in Silver Spring, Maryland, and consisted of five divisions. The NODC also had field offices collocated with major government or academic oceanographic laboratories in Stennis Space Center, Mississippi; Miami, Florida; La Jolla, San Diego, California; Seattle, Washington; Austin, Texas; Charleston, South Carolina; Norfolk, Virginia; and Honolulu, Hawaii. In 2015, NODC was merged with the National Climatic Data Center and the National Geophysical Data Center into the National Centers for Environmental Information (NCEI).

NOAA also operated two other data centers: National Climatic Data Center (NCDC), Asheville, North Carolina, and National Geophysical Data Center (NGDC), Boulder, Colorado. In 2015, the three merged to form the National Centers for Environmental Information (NCEI). The National Snow and Ice Data Center (NSIDC) in Boulder, Colorado, is also operated for NGDC by the University of Colorado through the Cooperative Institute for Research in Environmental Sciences (CIRES).

These discipline-oriented centers served as national repositories and dissemination facilities for global environmental data. The data archives amassed by the NODC and the other centers provide a record of Earth's changing environment, support numerous research and operational applications, and are still available through the NCEI. Working cooperatively, the centers provided data products and services to scientists, engineers, resource managers, policy makers, and other users—both in the United States and around the world.

== History ==
Established in 1961, the NODC was originally an interagency facility administered by the U.S. Naval Hydrographic (later Oceanographic) Office. The NODC was transferred to NOAA in 1970 when NOAA was created by Executive Order by then-President, Richard Nixon. In the words of its charter, the NODC serves to "acquire, process, preserve, and disseminate oceanographic data." Its primary mission is to ensure that global oceanographic data sets collected at great cost are maintained in a permanent archive that is easily accessible to the world science community, and to other users.

== Mission ==
The NODC's mission statement was "To provide scientific stewardship of marine data and information".

== Core description ==
The National Oceanographic Data Center, National Coastal Data Development Center (NCDDC) and NOAA Central Library, with its regional branch assets, were integrated to provide access to the world's most comprehensive sources of marine environmental data and information. NODC maintains and updates a national ocean archive with environmental data acquired from domestic and foreign activities, and produces products and research from these data, to help monitor global environmental changes. The data included physical, biological and chemical measurements derived from in situ oceanographic observations, satellite remote sensing of the oceans, and ocean model simulations. NODC personnel directly interacted with federal, state, academic, and industrial oceanographic activities, represent NESDIS on various interagency domestic panels, committees and councils, and represent the United States in various international organizations, such as the International Oceanographic Data Exchange. The Data Center represents NESDIS and NOAA to the general public, government agencies, private institutions, foreign governments, and the private sector on matters involving oceanographic data.

== Data holdings ==
The NODC managed the world's largest collection of publicly available oceanographic data. NODC holdings included in situ and remotely sensed physical, chemical, and biological oceanographic data from coastal and deep ocean areas. These were originally collected for a variety of operational and research missions by U.S. Federal agencies, including the Department of Defense (primarily the U.S. Navy); by State and local government agencies; by universities and research institutions; and private industry. NODC data holdings extended back over a hundred years, and the volume is expected to grow exponentially as new ocean observing systems are deployed.

Through NODC archive and access services, these ocean data were reused to answer questions about climate change, ocean phenomena, and management of coastal and marine resources, marine transportation, recreation, national security, and natural disasters. Another significant user community is Education, where these data and information products help teach each new generation of students about the oceans. Requests for oceanographic data and information have increased each year since the Center was established in 1961. Access to these archives is still available through the NCEI.

=== International cooperation and data exchange ===
A significant percentage of the oceanographic data held by NODC was foreign. NODC acquired foreign data through direct bilateral exchanges with other countries, and through the facilities of the World Data Center for Oceanography, Silver Spring, which is collocated with, and operated by, NODC.

There are three World Data Centers for Oceanography: World Data Center, Silver Spring, Maryland, United States, World Data Center, Moscow, Russia, and World Data Center, Tianjin, People's Republic of China. They are part of the World Data Center System initiated in 1957 to provide a mechanism for data exchange, and they operate under guidelines issued by the International Council of Scientific Unions (ICSU).

Under NODC leadership, the Global Data Archeology and Rescue (GODAR) project grew into a major international program sponsored by the Inter-governmental Oceanographic Commission. GODAR is a comprehensive effort to locate, rescue, quality control, and disseminate historical global ocean profile data for use by the climate and global change research community.

=== Data management for global change studies ===
The NODC provided data management support for major ocean science projects and promotes improved working relations with the academic ocean research community.

== NOAA library and information network ==
The NODC also managed the NOAA Library and Information Network, which included the NOAA Central Library in Silver Spring, MD; regional libraries in Miami, FL and Seattle, WA; and field libraries or information centers at about 30 NOAA sites throughout the United States. The combined libraries contained millions of volumes including books, journals, CD-ROMs, DVDs, audio, and video tapes. These holdings are now managed by the NCEI.

=== User services ===
Each year, the NODC responded to thousands of requests for oceanographic data and information. Copies of specified data sets or data selected from the NODC's archive databases were provided to users on various media types, or online. NODC data products were provided at prices that cover the cost of data selection and retrieval. However, data provided on the NODC public website is free of charge.

== See also ==
- Expocode
