= World Data Center =

Archive of IGY observational data sets

World Data Centre
- Abbreviation: WDC
- Successor: World Data System (WDS)
- Formation: 1957
- Dissolved: 2008
- Type: INGO
- Purpose: Geophysical data archive
- Region served: Worldwide
- Official language: English, French
- Parent organization: International Council for Science (ICSU)

The World Data Centre (WDC) system was created to archive and distribute data collected from the observational programmes of the 1957–1958 International Geophysical Year by the International Council of Scientific Unions (ICSU). The WDCs were funded and maintained by their host countries on behalf of the international science community.

Originally established in the United States (WDC A), Soviet Union (WDC B), Europe and Japan (WDC C), the WDC system expanded to other countries and to new scientific disciplines. The WDC system included up to 52 Centres in 15 countries, with some data centres replicating another. All data held in WDCs were available for the cost of copying and sending the requested information. In 1968 the ICSU Panel on World Data Centers (Geophysical, Solar, and Environmental) was established to coordinate activities and to establish operating criteria for the WDCs.

At the end of 2008, following the ICSU General Assembly in Maputo (Mozambique), the World Data Centres were reformed and a new ISC World Data System (WDS) established in 2009. Expanding on the 50-year heritage of the ICSU World Data Centre system (WDC) and the ICSU Federation of Astronomical and Geophysical data-analysis Services, most of the legacy data centers and services continued under the WDS.

== List of World Data Centres and Services ==
Centre or Service	Acronym	Parent	Host	Nation	Year	Notes
International Gravimetric Bureau	BGI	IAG, CNES	Observatoire Midi-Pyrénées	France	1951	bgi.obs-mip.fr
International Space Environment Service	ISES	Natural Resources Canada	Geomagnetic Laboratory	Canada	1956	www.spaceweather.org
International Service of Geomagnetic Indices	ISGI	IUGG	Observatory for Earth Sciences (EOST)	France	1956	
Solar-Terrestrial Physics	STP	Russian Academy of Sciences	Geophysical Center	Russia	1956	
Solar-Terrestrial Physics	STP	NOAA	National Geophysical Data Center (NGDC)	US	1957	NBS 1957–1964, NGDC 1965–2015, NCEI
Solar-Terrestrial Physics	STP	NERC	Rutherford Appleton Laboratory	UK	1979	www.ralspace.stfc.ac.uk
Solar-Terrestrial Physics	STP	Bureau of Meteorology	IPS Radio and Space Services	Australia	2000	www.sws.bom.gov.au/World_Data_Centre
Airglow		Ministry of Education	National Astronomical Observatory of Japan	Japan	1957	solarwww.mtk.nao.ac.jp
Cosmic Rays	CR	Nagoya University	Solar-Terrestrial Environment Laboratory	Japan	1957	cidas.isee.nagoya-u.ac.jp
Cosmic Rays	CR	NOAA	National Geophysical Data Center (NGDC)	US	1957	University of Minnesota 1957–1966, Aeronomy and Space Data Center 1966–1972, NGDC 1972–2015, NCEI
Geomagnetism		Kyoto University	Geophysical Institute	Japan	1957	INTERMAGNET
Geomagnetism		NOAA	National Geophysical Data Center (NGDC)	US	1957	C&GS 1957–1964, NGDC 1965–2015, NCEI
Geomagnetism		NERC	British Geological Survey	UK	1966	www.wdc.bgs.ac.uk
Geomagnetism		DTU Space	Danish Meteorological Institute	Denmark	1957	www.space.dtu.dk
Geomagnetism			Indian Institute of Geomagnetism	India	1971	
Glaciology		NOAA	National Snow and Ice Data Center (NSIDC)	US	1957	AGS 1957–1969, USGS 1970–1976
Glaciology		University of Cambridge	Scott Polar Research Institute	UK	1957	www.wdcgc.spri.cam.ac.uk
Glaciology		Chinese Academy of Sciences	Cold and Arid Regions Environmental and Engineering Research Institute (CARD)	China	1988	
Ionosphere			National Institute of Information and Communications Technology (NICT)	Japan	1957	wdc.nict.go.jp
Meteorology	MET	NOAA	National Climatic Data Center (NCDC)	US	1957	National Weather Records Center (NWRC) 1957–1967, NCDC 1967–2015, NCEI
Meteorology	MET	Chinese Academy of Sciences	National Meteorological Information Center	China	1988	
Meteorology	MET		All-Russian Research Institute of Hydrometeorological Information	Russia		
Oceanography		NOAA	National Oceanographic Data Center (NODC)	US	1957	Texas A&M 1957–1961, NODC 1961–2015, NCEI
Oceanography		State Oceanic Administration	National Marine Data and Information Service	China	1988	
Permanent Service for Mean Sea Level	PSMSL		National Oceanography Centre (NOC)	UK	1957	formerly Proudman Oceanographic Laboratory, Liverpool
Rockets and Satellites		NASA	NASA Space Science Data Coordinated Archive (NSSDCA)	US	1957	US National Academy of Sciences 1957–1968
Nuclear Radiation		Japan Meteorological Agency	Meteorological Research Institute	Japan	1957	
Aurora		NOAA	National Geophysical Data Center (NGDC)	US	1957	Cornell University 1957–1967, NGDC 1967–2015, NCEI
Aurora			National Institute of Polar Research	Japan	1981	polaris.nipr.ac.jp
International Center for Earth Tides	ICET	University of French Polynesia	Tahiti Geodetic Observatory	France	1966	igets.u-strasbg.fr
Soils		IUSS	International Soil Reference and Information Centre (ISRIC)	Netherlands	1966	
Solar Radio Emissions		National Astronomical Observatory of Japan	Nobeyama Solar Radio Observatory	Japan	1969	
Tsunamis		NOAA	National Geophysical Data Center (NGDC)	US	1969	ngdc.noaa.gov
Space Science		JAXA	Institute of Space and Astronautical Science	Japan	1969	
Space Science		Chinese Academy of Sciences	National Space Science Center	China	1988	www.cssdc.ac.cn
Solid Earth Geophysics	SEG	NOAA	National Geophysical Data Center (NGDC)	US	1971	NGDC 1971–2015, NCEI
Solid Earth Geophysics	SEG	Chinese Academy of Sciences	Institute of Geology and Geophysics	China	1988	
Astronomy		IAU, Centre National de la Recherche Scientifique (CNRS)	Centre de données astronomiques de Strasbourg (CDS)	France	1972	cds.unistra.fr
Astronomy		Chinese Academy of Sciences	Beijing Astronomical Observatory	China	1988	
Rotation of the Earth			United States Naval Observatory (USNO)	US	1972	
Climate		University of Hamburg	Max Planck Institute for Meteorology	Germany	1975	www.wdc-climate.de
Marine Geology and Geophysics		NOAA	National Geophysical Data Center (NGDC)	US	1975	NGDC 1975–2015, NCEI
Solar Activity			Observatoire de Meudon	France	1978	
Atmospheric Trace Gases		Department of Energy	Carbon Dioxide Information Analysis Center (CDIAC)	US	1982	ess-dive.lbl.gov
Sunspot Index & Solar Influences	SILSO, SIDC	IAU	Royal Observatory of Belgium	Belgium	1985	www.sidc.be
World Glacier Monitoring Service	WGMS	IUGG	University of Zurich	Switzerland	1986	
Seismology		USGS	National Earthquake Information Center (NEIC)	US	1986	
International Earth Rotation and Reference Systems Service	IERS		United States Naval Observatory (USNO)	US	1988	www.iers.org
Paleoclimatology		NOAA	National Geophysical Data Center (NGDC)	US	1989	NGDC 1989–2015, NCEI
International GNSS Service	IGS	IUGG	NASA Jet Propulsion Laboratory	US	1994	igs.org
Human Interactions in the Environment		Center for International Earth Science Information Network (CIESIN)	NASA Socioeconomic Data and Applications Center (SEDAC)	US	1995	
International VLBI Service for Geodesy and Astrometry	IVS	IUGG	NASA Crustal Dynamics Data Information System (CDDIS)	US	2001	ivscc.gsfc.nasa.gov
Biodiversity and Ecology		USGS	Center for Biological Informatics	US	2001	
Marine Environmental Sciences	MARE	Alfred Wegener Institute for Polar and Marine Research	Center for Marine Environmental Sciences (MARUM)	Germany	2001	www.marum.de
Land Cover Data & Remotely Sensed Land Data		USGS	Earth Resources Observation Systems (EROS)	US	2002	
Recent Crustal Movements	RCM	Institute of Geophysics	Geodetic Observatory Pecný	Czech Republic	2002–2006	IAG International Center on Recent Crustal Movements (ICRCM) 1976–1996
Remote Sensing of the Atmosphere	RSAT	DLR	German Remote Sensing Data Centre (DFD)	Germany	2003	wdc.dlr.de

== See also ==
- CODATA
- International Polar Year
- WMO Global Atmosphere Watch World Data Centres
- data center
