= Cormier (name) =

Cormier is a French surname.

== Geographical distribution ==
As of 2014, 46.6% of all known bearers of the surname Cormier were residents of Canada (frequency 1:1,439), 38.8% of the United States (1:16,985) and 13.2% of France (1:9,209).

In France, the frequency of the surname was higher than national average (1:9,209) in the following regions:

1. Saint Pierre and Miquelon (1:133)
2. Pays de la Loire (1:1,679)
3. Centre-Val de Loire (1:2,595)
4. Brittany (1:5,303)
5. Normandy (1:6,434)
6. Île-de-France (1:8,172)

In Canada, the frequency of the surname was higher than national average (1:1,439) in the following provinces:

1. New Brunswick (1:87)
2. Prince Edward Island (1:524)
3. Nova Scotia (1:856)
4. Quebec (1:1,017)
5. Northwest Territories (1:1,376)

In the United States, the frequency of the surname was higher than national average (1:16,985) in the following states:

1. Louisiana (1:979)
2. Maine (1:1,579)
3. New Hampshire (1:1,796)
4. Massachusetts (1:1,871)
5. Connecticut (1:4,509)
6. Vermont (1:5,047)
7. Rhode Island (1:6,014)
8. Texas (1:12,139)

== People ==
- Cedric Cormier (born 1979), American football player
- Charles Cormier (1813–1887), Quebec businessman and political figure
- Chris Cormier (born 1967), American professional bodybuilder
- Clarence Cormier (1930–2012), New Brunswick politician
- Clément Cormier (1910–1987), Canadian Priest, academic and the vice chancellor and founder of Université de Moncton
- Daniel Cormier (born 1979), American mixed martial artist
- Ernest Cormier (1885–1980), Quebec engineer and architect
- Gordon Cormier (born 2009), Canadian actor
- Hal Cormier, Canadian politician
- Hyacinthe-Marie Cormier (1832–1916), French Dominican priest, 76th Master of the Order
- J. P. Cormier (born 1969), Canadian singer-songwriter and multi-instrumentalist
- Lance Cormier (born 1980), American baseball pitcher
- Len Cormier (1924–2008), American aerospace engineer
- Liam Cormier (born 1980), Canadian musician
- Patrice Cormier (born 1990), Canadian ice hockey player
- Rheal Cormier (1967–2021), Canadian-American baseball pitcher
- Robert Cormier (1925–2000), American author, columnist, and newspaper reporter
- Robert Cormier (colonist) (1610–1712), French colonizer, ship's carpenter and family founder
- Robert De Cormier (1922–2017), American musical conductor, arranger, and director
- Yvon Cormier (1938–2009), ring name "The Beast", Canadian professional wrestler
