= Mark Serreze =

American geographer

Mark Clifford Serreze
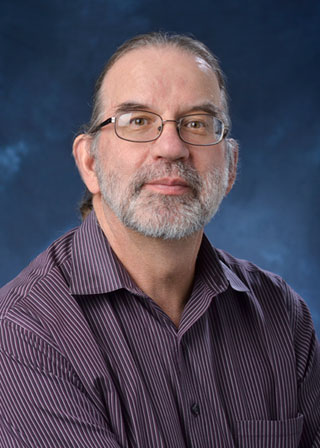
- Born: 1960 (age 65–66)
- Education: University of Colorado Boulder
- Scientific career
- Fields: Geography, Climatology
- Workplaces: Cooperative Institute for Research in Environmental Sciences, National Snow and Ice Data Center
- Thesis: Seasonal and interannual variations of sea ice motion in the Canada basin and their relationships with the Arctic atmospheric circulation (1989)
- Doctoral advisor: Roger G. Barry

Mark Clifford Serreze (born 1960) is an American geographer and the director (since 2009) of the National Snow and Ice Data Center (NSIDC), a project of the Cooperative Institute for Research in Environmental Sciences at the University of Colorado Boulder. In 2019, he was named a Distinguished Professor in the Department of Geography. Serreze is primarily known for his expertise in the Arctic sea ice decline that has occurred over the last few decades due to global warming, a topic about which he has expressed serious concern. He has authored over 150 peer-reviewed publications.

== Early life and education ==
Serreze grew up in Maine, and credits its frequent snowy weather as an inspiration for his interest in studying ice. He received his PhD from the University of Colorado Boulder in 1989.

== Views on sea ice and global warming ==
In 2007, Serreze said that given the increasingly rapid rate at which Arctic ice has been melting, he thought it was "very reasonable" to expect the Arctic to be ice-free by 2030. He also blamed the decline primarily on anthropogenic global warming. Serreze became well known in 2008 when he described the state of Arctic sea ice as being in a "death spiral", and said it could disappear in the summers within several decades. Also that year, when contacted by the Associated Press, Serreze described the state of Arctic sea ice as being at a "tipping point," after which sea ice will plummet rapidly and added that 2007's then-record low sea ice levels were due in part to wind currents and other weather conditions as well as global warming.

In regards to Antarctic sea ice extent, Serreze noted in an interview 2012 that it has been known for years that Arctic sea ice vanishes first, and thus it is not a surprise that observations do not show big reductions and Antarctic sea ice doesn't disprove global warming.

== Music ==
Serreze is a keyboardist, singer, and songwriter for the rock band The Hobbled Neurons, which released the album "Einstein's Bender" in 2023.

== Media appearances ==
In 2006 he was featured in the Discovery Channel documentary Global Warming: What You Need to Know.

== See also ==
- Climate change in the Arctic

== Publications ==
- Serreze, Mark C. and Roger G. Barry (2014) The Arctic Climate System. 2nd edition. Cambridge University Press. ISBN 9781139583817.
- Serreze, Mark C. (2018) Brave New Arctic: The Untold Story of the Melting North. Princeton University Press. ISBN 9780691173993.
