= Exchange for Local Observations and Knowledge of the Arctic =

Exchange for Local Observations and Knowledge of the Arctic

The Exchange for Local Observations and Knowledge of the Arctic, is an Arctic research data management program that combines local traditional knowledge (LTK) and local observations data from Indigenous Arctic residents utilizing effective and appropriate western methods to properly share Arctic Indigenous Knowledge. The LTK data the program stewards consists of observations of sea ice, weather, wildlife and comes in many forms such as written interview transcripts, audio or video tapes and files, photographs, artwork, illustrations and maps. Housed at the National Snow and Ice Data Center (NSIDC) at the University of Colorado Boulder Cooperative Institute for Research and Environmental Sciences (CIRES), ELOKA is a National Science Foundation (NSF) Arctic Observing Network (AON) research program that came out of the 2007–2008 International Polar Year.

== Data Sets ==
ELOKA data and information resources represent international and interdisciplinary collaboration between the physical and social sciences; between researcher(s) and communities and addresses cultural sensitivity issues that are not usually seen in standard physical science data management norms, but are critically important when administering documented forms of LTK and community-based monitoring. A variety of methods and tools are used on each data set as each project has different needs in presenting their data.

== History ==
Established in 2006 under an initial National Science Foundation (NSF) exploratory grant to address the need for an effective and appropriate system for recording, preserving and sharing data and information collected in Indigenous Arctic communities, ELOKA developed partnerships and defined the broad needs of the system defined as a set of people, communities, and technological components sharing information and working together to achieve particular goals. In 2009 NSIDC was awarded two more NSF awards to established an operational ELOKA data management and networking system for community-based research that keeps control of data in the hands of community data providers, while still allowing for broad searches and sharing of information. Building on the accomplishments of the first and second phases of ELOKA, the third phase of the program is to make it a sustained program at NSIDC and sustained presence in the Arctic research landscape. The critical next challenge is to sustain and evolve the established system to routinely support northern communities, NSF, and other investigators conducting community-based research to ensure these unique data are well preserved and readily useful by communities, researchers, service providers, decision makers, and others to help ELOKA support those meeting diverse urgent environmental and social challenges. The third phase also includes the addition of a six-member Advisory Committee of researchers and Indigenous leaders. The Committee is working with the ELOKA team to refine goals and objectives, and priorities.

== International and Domestic Collaborations ==
ELOKA values building sustainable relationships with northern communities and researchers and understands that those relationships can only be built on a foundation of trust. Through an ongoing outreach program ELOKA has established a pan-Arctic network of community researchers and data practitioners that have greatly increased the recognition of the value and techniques of sound community data management. ELOKA has established a suite of technology and services to support, arc hive and provide access to diverse data including community-based meteorological data, quantitative and qualitative observations of sea ice from local experts, hand drawn maps and detailed interviews of Inuit hunters and Elders, controlled access to environmental and species observations of the Bering Sea region, oral histories from Siberia, and more. ELOKA collaborates with many domestic and international organizations engaged in addressing LTK and community-based monitoring data management issues. Together, they work to build a community of practice that facilitates international knowledge exchange, development of resources, and collaboration focused on local communities and stewardship of their data, information, and knowledge. ELOKA continues to seek new partners and the collaborative network continues to grow.
