= 1628 Camarines earthquake =

Earthquake in the Philippines

- Local date: 1628
- Epicenter: 13.2°N 123.7°E
- Type: Unknown
- Areas affected: Philippines
- Total damage: Severe

The 1628 Camarines earthquake struck Camarines, in the Philippines in 1628. Fourteen different shocks were recorded. The date is unknown. The United States' National Geophysical Data Center describes the damage as "severe" and the total number of homes damaged as "many".

== See also ==
- List of earthquakes in the Philippines
- List of historical earthquakes
