= Cormier =

Cormier (/ˈkɔːrmieɪ/; [kɔʁmje]) may refer to:

== Surname ==
- Cormier (name)

== Places ==
- Cormier-Village, New Brunswick, a small village east of Shediac, New Brunswick, Canada, site of the 1989 Cormier-Village hayride accident
- Le Cormier, a commune in the Eure department in northern France
- Saint-Aubin-du-Cormier, a commune in the Ille-et-Vilaine department in Brittany in northwestern France

== In fiction ==
- Delphine Cormier, a fictional character in the television series Orphan Black.
