= Ksar Saïd Palace =

Former beylical Palace in Bardo near Tunis, Tunisia

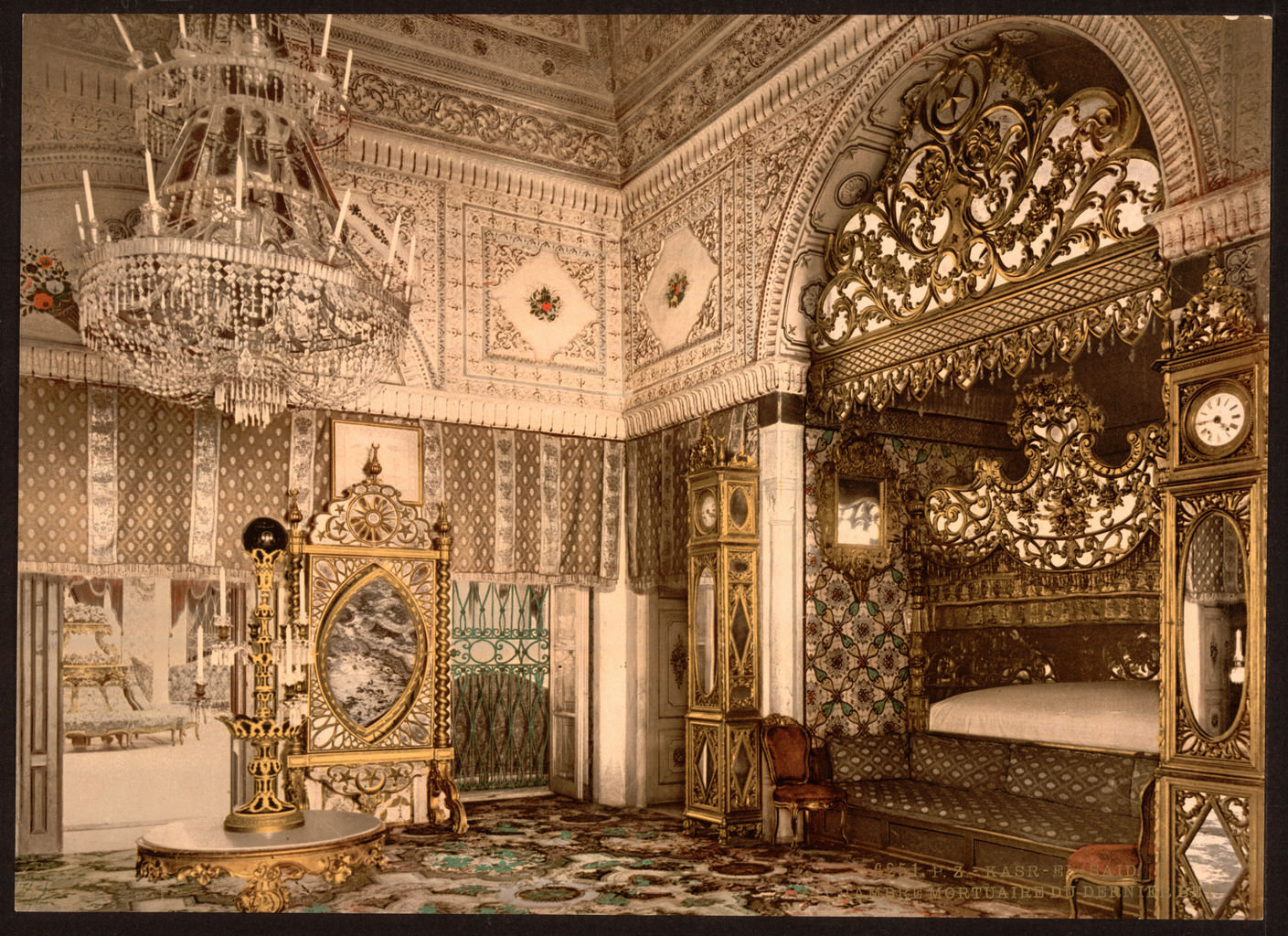
- Bedchamber of the King of Tunisia
- Interactive map of the Ksar Saïd Palace area

General information
- Type: Palace , Museum
- Architectural style: Tunisian ,Italian ,Moorish
- Location: Le Bardo, Tunisia
- Coordinates: 36.8114°N 10.1295°E
- Completed: 1845
- Client: Muhammad III as-Sadiq Ismaïl Es-Sounni

Website
- https://ksarsaid.net

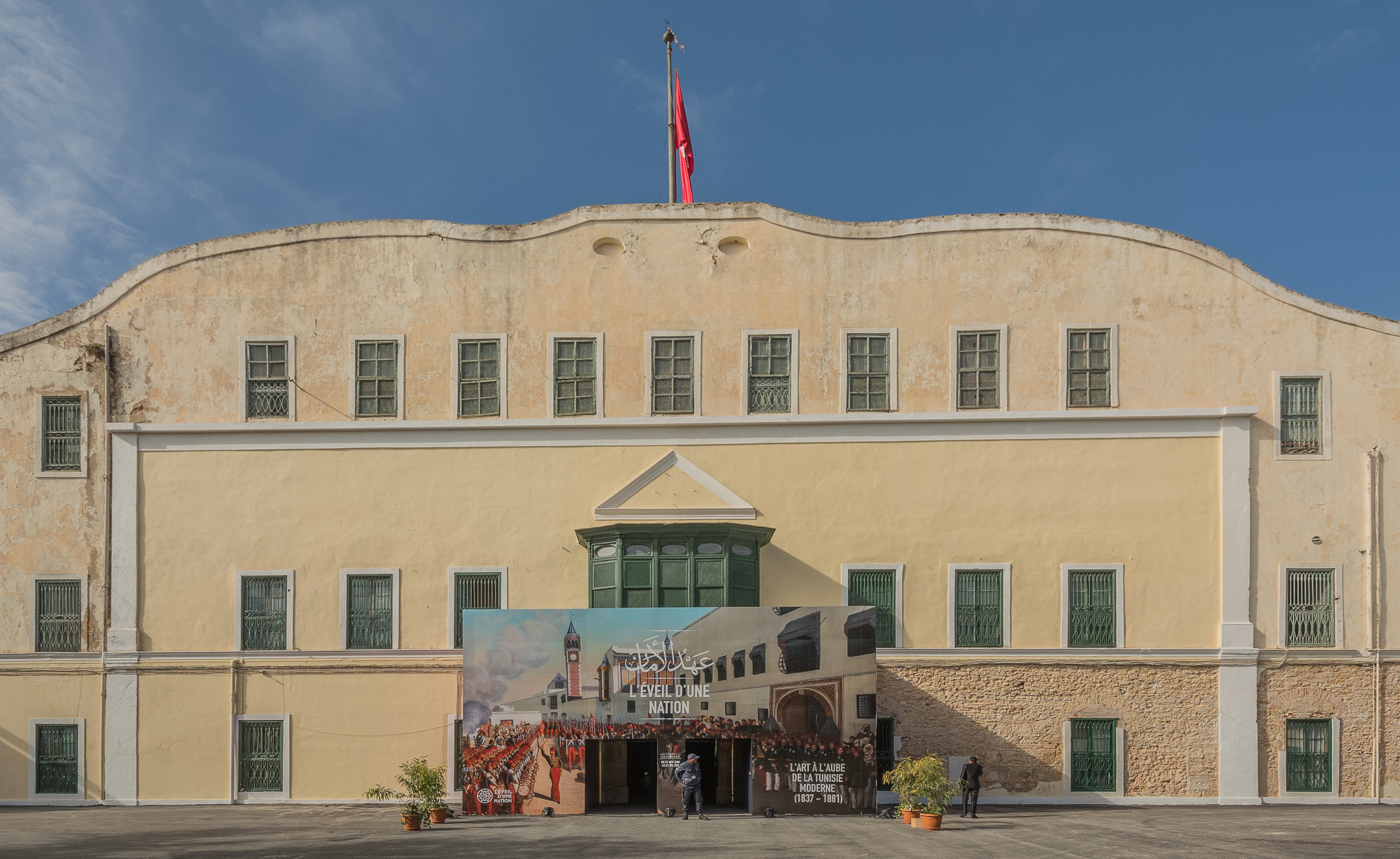
Façade of the Ksar Saïd palace

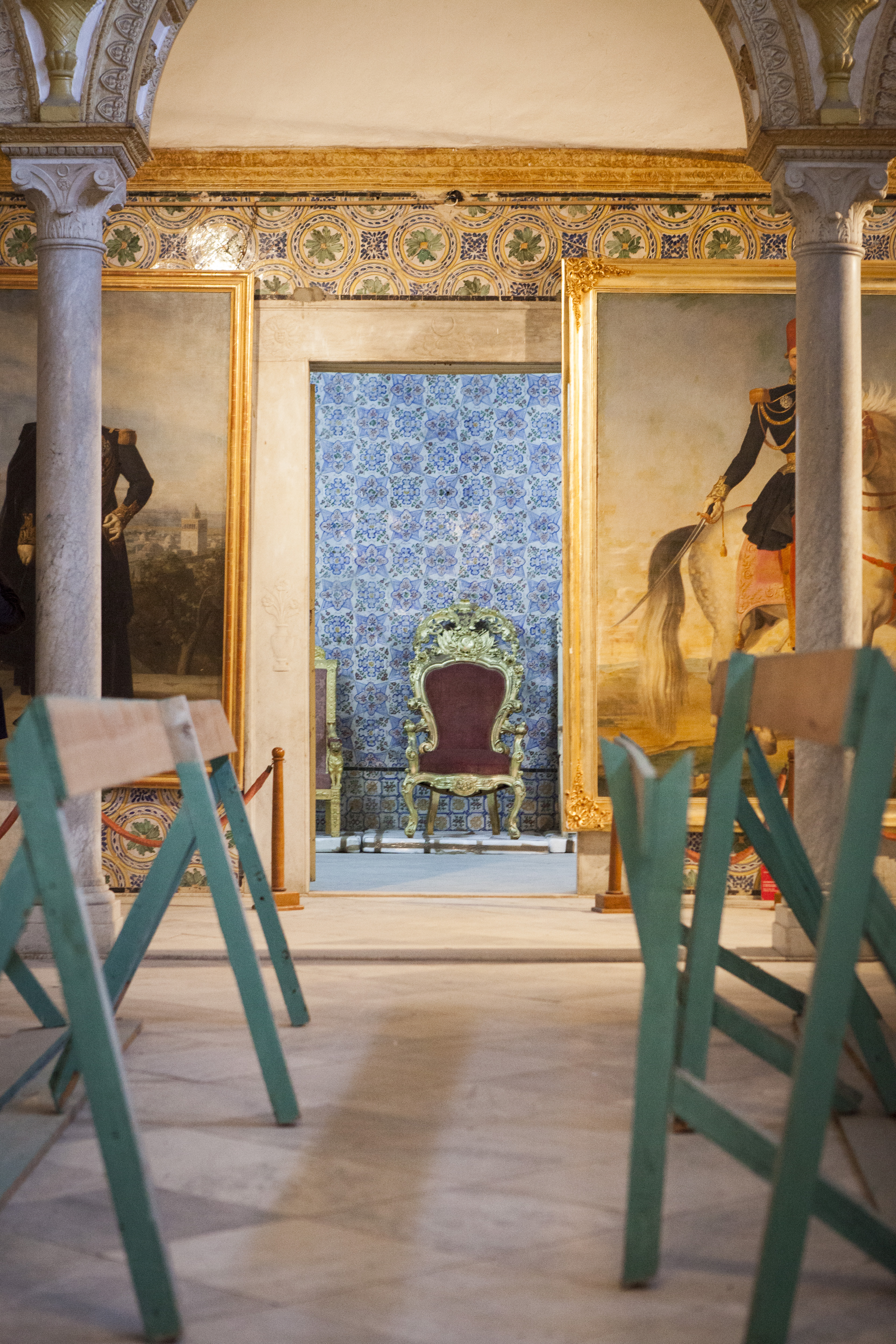
Palace interior

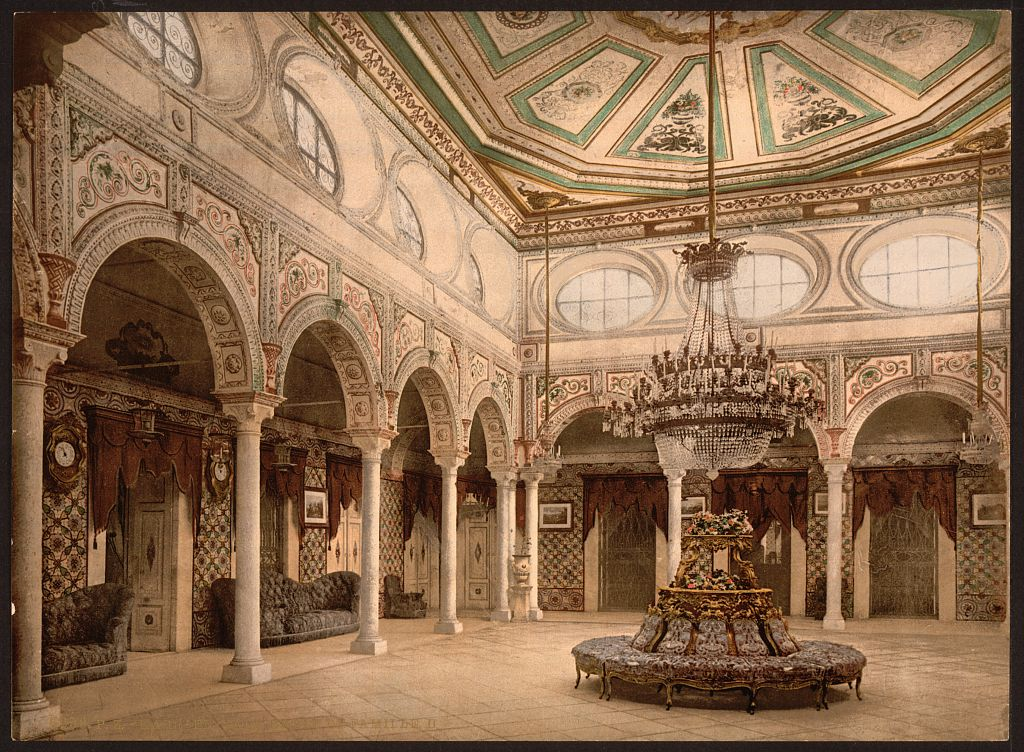
Grand Saloon

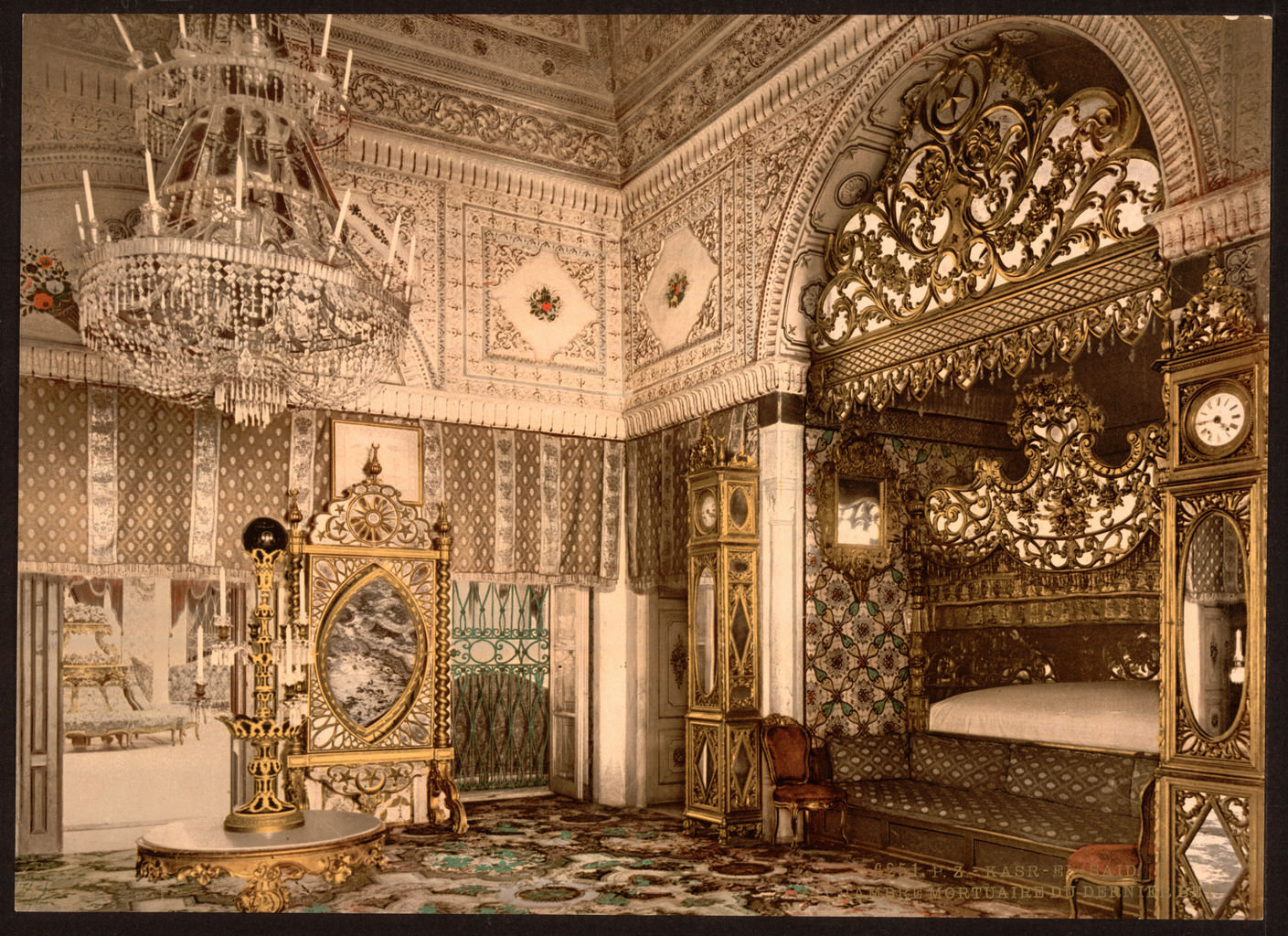
Bedroom of the Bey

The Ksar Saïd palace is a former palace of the Tunisian Beys in Le Bardo, a suburb of Tunis, Tunisia. It is close the other major residence of the Husainid dynasty, the Bardo palace. Since 2019, the palace is officially named Ksar Saïd, Palace of Letters and Arts, and is open to the public.

== History ==
Originally, the palace was the preferred residence of Ismaïl Es-Sounni, a high dignitary of the Husainid dynasty and brother-in-law of Muhammad Bey (1811–1859) and Muhammad III Sadiq Bey (1813–1882).

In 1867, Ismaïl Es-Sounni was accused of plotting against Muhammad III Sadiq Bey and executed. Muhammad III Sadiq Bey took possession of the palace, renaming it Ksar Saïd ("Blessed Palace") as a propitiatory title, and moved in after significant renovations in 1869. It was at the Ksar Saïd palace that Muhammad III Sadiq Bey was compelled to sign the Treaty of Bardo on 12 May 1881, marking the beginning of the French protectorate in Tunisia.

After Muhammad III Sadiq Bey's death in 1882, the palace was abandoned by his successor Ali III Bey (1817–1902), who preferred to settle in La Marsa, in the Dar al-Taj Palace.

French geophysicist Charles Lallemand (1857–1938), staying in Tunis in the years following the establishment of the protectorate, noted about the Ksar Saïd palace: "The Ksar Saïd palace is surrounded by magnificent gardens. Its orangery is superb, covering several hectares and containing thousands of golden apple trees. The palace itself is in quite good condition, and some apartments are well-maintained."

At the beginning of the 20th century, the palace became a beylical residence again under Muhammad IV al-Hadi Bey (1855-1906), who was the only sovereign to inhabit it after Muhammad III Sadiq Bey. In 1951, Lamine Bey (1881–1962) turned Ksar Saïd into the headquarters of a hospital named after him, later renamed Aboulkacem-Chabbi Hospital in 1957. During this period, the palace underwent certain modifications and additions.

Given the historical significance of the palace, an attempt was made in 1981 to establish a museum of modern and contemporary history of Tunisia, but the museum was never inaugurated, and its opening was repeatedly postponed. The idea of creating a museum dedicated to the beys of the Muradid (1613–1702) and Husainid (1705–1957) dynasties within the palace was considered after the Tunisian Revolution of 2011. In 2016–2017, an exhibition titled "The Awakening of a Nation," focused on the reforms initiated by Tunisia between 1830 and 1881, took place there.

In March 2019, after restoration work, the palace was renamed "Ksar Saïd, Palace of Letters and Arts," inaugurated by Prime Minister Youssef Chahed, and reopened to the public. In 2020, Moncef Ben Moussa was appointed the general director of Ksar Saïd.

On 15 March 2022, the palace was classified as a historical monument.

== Decoration ==
In terms of architecture and decoration, Ksar Saïd resembles the beylical palaces and residences of 19th-century Tunisia. Deep European influences are evident, alongside a certain fidelity to local architectural and decorative styles. This syncretism, far from being a mix of genres, constitutes a successful synthesis where diverse styles coexist harmoniously, showcasing the monument's originality and elegance.

European influence is primarily visible in the general architecture of the palace, with the first floor becoming the noble part of the building. Both ceremonial salons and the bey's private apartments are found on this floor. This influence is highly noticeable in the interior decoration of the rooms, with walls extensively covered in ceramic tiles mainly imported from Italy. White marble from Carrara, Italy, is also used in columns, capitals, door frames, pavements, and more.

All paintings on the ceilings are of Italian origin, as are the furniture, hangings, and furnishings, as shown in photographs and postcards from the early 20th century. This preference for the European style, clear at Ksar Saïd, did not lead to an abandonment of the local tradition. In various rooms of the palace, significant references to Tunisian architectural and decorative repertoire exist.

This is evident in two ceremonial salons on the first floor overlooking the central courtyard: the right salon, like most Tunisian houses, has a T-shaped plan with alcoves, while the left salon has a vaulted ceiling adorned with plaster sculptures featuring rosette motifs executed using the nakch hdida technique.

== Collections ==
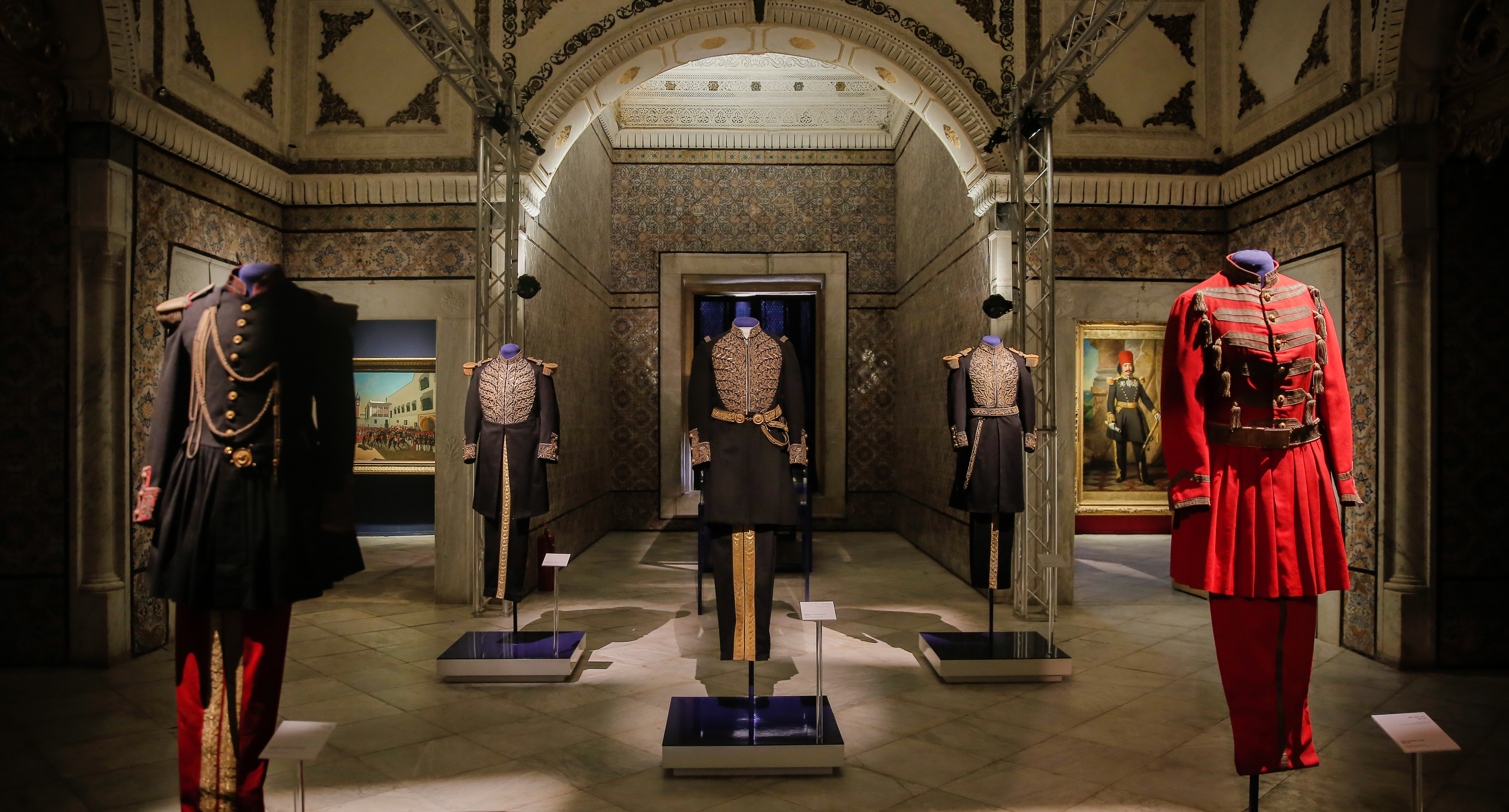
Palace interior during the L’éveil d’une nation exhibition

The palace of Ksar Saïd houses remarkable collections, with the largest being historical paintings of considerable size representing Tunisian or foreign statesmen and significant events in the country's history.

Among these paintings are Ahmad I Bey (1805–1855) in European uniform, Muhammad III Sadiq Bey laying his hand on the constitution of 1861, Hayreddin Pasha as a brigadier general, the grand vizier Mustapha Khaznadar (1817–1878) in his youth, Victor Emmanuel II, Ludwig II of Bavaria, and more. Other paintings immortalize events in national political life at the time, such as the return of the Tunisian army from Crimea in 1856, Sadiq Bey's meeting with Napoleon III in Algiers in 1860, or the audience granted in Brussels by King Leopold I of Belgium to Hayreddin Pasha, the bey's special envoy, and others.

These paintings bear the signatures of European master painters of the time, including Charles Gleyre, Auguste Moynier, Alexandre Debelle, Charles-Philippe Larivière, Feodor Dietz, and others. The palace also possesses a diverse collection of historical furniture, both locally made and imported. Notable pieces include beylical thrones from the mid-19th century adorned with gold leaf. The primary piece remains the 1881 table on which, exactly 83 years apart, the treaty establishing the protectorate and President Habib Bourguiba's decree of 12 May 1964, nationalizing farmlands held by colonists, were signed.

In addition to these collections, there is a collection of Husseinite decorations and medals from the 19th and 20th centuries. Most notably, the collection includes the Nichan Iftikhar, made of silver and enamel in beylical colors of red and green.

== Literature ==
- Gandolphe, Marcel (1941). Résidences Beylicales : Le Bardo- La Mohammedia- Kassar-Said - La Manouba – Hammam-Lif (in French). Tunis: Editions SAPI Tunisia.
- Revault, Jacques (1974). Palais et résidences d'été de la région de Tunis (XVIe-XIXe siècles) (in French). Paris: Editions du Centre National de la Recherche Scientifique. pp. 414–426. ISBN 2-222-01622-3.
- Abidi, Beya (2005). Palais des beys aux environs de la ville de Tunis, El-Abdaliya à la Marsa et Dar el-Bey à Hammam-Lif (en arabe) (mémoire de master) (Thesis) (in Arabic). Tunis: Facultés des Lettres, des Arts et des Humanités de Manouba.
- L'Éveil d'une nation [exposition, Tunis, Palais Qsar es-Saïd, du 27 novembre 2016 au 27 février 2017] (in French). Tunis: Officina Libraria. 2016. p. 246. ISBN 978-88-99765-25-5.
