= National Snow and Ice Data Center =

U.S. information and referral center

The National Snow and Ice Data Center (NSIDC) is a United States information and referral center in support of polar and cryospheric research. NSIDC archives and distributes digital and analog snow and ice data and also maintains information about snow cover, avalanches, glaciers, ice sheets, freshwater ice, sea ice, ground ice, permafrost, atmospheric ice, paleoglaciology, and ice cores.

NSIDC is part of the University of Colorado Boulder Cooperative Institute for Research in Environmental Sciences (CIRES), and is affiliated with the National Oceanic and Atmospheric Administration (NOAA) National Centers for Environmental Information through a cooperative agreement. NSIDC serves as one of twelve Distributed Active Archive Centers funded by the National Aeronautics and Space Administration to archive and distribute data from NASA's past and current satellites and field measurement programs. NSIDC also supports the National Science Foundation through the Exchange For Local Observations and Knowledge of the Arctic (ELOKA) and other scientific research grants. NSIDC is also a member of the ICSU World Data System. Mark Serreze is the director of NSIDC.

== History ==
The World Data Center (WDC) for Glaciology, Boulder, a data center responsible for archiving all available glaciological information, was established at the American Geographical Society under Dr. William O. Field, Director, in 1957. Between 1971 and 1976 it was operated by the U.S. Geological Survey, Glaciology Project Office, under the direction of Dr. Mark F. Meier.

In 1976, responsibility for the WDC for Glaciology was transferred to NOAA, Environmental Data and Information Service (EDIS), and the center moved to the University of Colorado at Boulder under the direction of Professor Roger G. Barry. In 1982, NOAA created the National Snow and Ice Data Center (NSIDC) as a means to expand the WDC holdings and as a place to archive data from some NOAA programs. In the 1980s and 1990s, support to NSIDC widened with NASA funding for the Snow and Ice Distributed Active Archive Center (DAAC) and NSF funding to manage selected Arctic and Antarctic data and metadata.

=== Milestones ===
- 1957–58: First International Geophysical Year
- 1957: U.S. National Committee for the IGY awards the operation of WDC-A for Glaciology to the American Geographical Society
- 1970: WDC for Glaciology transfers from the American Geographical Society to the U.S. Geological Survey in Tacoma, Washington
- 1976: WDC for Glaciology transfers from the U.S. Geological Survey in Tacoma, Washington to the University of Colorado at Boulder, Colorado under the direction of Roger Barry
- 1982: NOAA designates the National Snow and Ice Data Center
- 1983: NSIDC receives grant from NASA for archiving Nimbus 7 passive microwave data
- 1990: NSIDC receives funding from NSF for Arctic System Science (ARCSS) Data Coordination Center (ADCC)
- 1993: NSIDC receives first DAAC contract
- 1996: Antarctic Data Coordination Center (ADCC) established with NSF support
- 1999: Antarctic Glaciological Data Center (AGDC) established with NSF support
- 2001: NSIDC celebrates its 25th Anniversary
- 2002: Frozen Ground Data Center established with International Arctic Research Center (IARC) support
- 2003: Full suite of Earth Observing System (EOS) cryospheric sensors (AMSR, GLAS, MODIS) in orbit
- 2009: Mark Serreze named NSIDC director

== International interactions ==
International science and data management programs facilitate the free exchange of data and accelerate research aimed at understanding the role of the cryosphere in the Earth system. NSIDC contributes to a number of international programs. Most of these programs, only a few of which are mentioned here, fall under the aegis of the International Council of Scientific Unions (ICSU).

NSIDC scientists participate in International Union of Geodesy and Geophysics (IUGG), International Association of Cryospheric Sciences (IACS), and in activities of the International Permafrost Association (IPA), the Global Digital Sea Ice Data Bank (GDSIDB), and the World Climate Research Programme (WCRP), including Climate and Cryosphere (CliC), Global Energy and Water Cycle Experiment (GEWEX), the Global Climate Observing System (GCOS), and the Global Earth Observation System of Systems (GEOSS). Former NSIDC Director, Roger G. Barry, was co-Vice Chair of the WCRP CliC Scientific Steering Group until 2005, and was a member of the GCOS/Global Terrestrial Observing System (GTOS) Terrestrial Observation Panel for Climate through 2007.

== Research ==
Researchers at NSIDC investigate the dynamics of Antarctic ice shelves, new techniques for the remote sensing of snow and freeze/thaw cycle of soils, the role of snow in hydrologic modeling, linkages between changes in sea ice extent and weather patterns, large-scale shifts in polar climate, river and lake ice, and the distribution and characteristics of seasonally and permanently frozen ground. In-house scientists pursue their work as part of the CIRES Cryospheric and Polar Process Division, University of Colorado Boulder.

NSIDC also monitors Arctic and Antarctic sea ice in near real time, and regularly posts sea ice extent data and analysis on its Arctic Sea Ice News and Analysis page.

== Local and traditional knowledge ==
A research project of the NSIDC is the Exchange For Local Observations and Knowledge of the Arctic or ELOKA. It is a collaborative international effort that was launched during the 2007–2009 International Polar Year. ELOKA facilitates the collection, preservation, exchange, and use of local observations and knowledge of the Arctic. Data management and user support are provided by ELOKA while it fosters collaboration between resident Arctic experts and visiting researchers. By working together, Arctic residents and researchers have made significant contributions to our understanding of the Arctic and recent changes to it. A key challenge of local and traditional knowledge (LTK) research and community-based monitoring is having an effective and appropriate means of recording, storing, and managing data and information. There is also the issue of finding an effective means of making such data available to Arctic residents and researchers, as well as other interested groups such as teachers, students, and decision makers. Without a network and data management system to support LTK and community-based research, a number of problems have arisen. ELOKA aims to fill this gap.

== Data ==
In February 2025, data from the NSIDC showed total global sea ice extent to be at an all-time low.

== See also ==
- CIRES
- Distributed Active Archive Centers
- Earth Observing System
- Antarctic ice pack
- Arctic ice pack
- University of Colorado at Boulder
