= Global Warming: What You Need to Know =

- Directed by: Nicolas Brown
- Written by: Kathy Abbott; Izhar Harpaz; Tim Sandler
- Starring: Tom Brokaw; James Hansen; Michael Oppenheimer
- Cinematography: Mark Molesworth
- Edited by: David Varga
- Music by: Michael Clinco
- Distributed by: Discovery Channel
- Release date: July 16, 2006 (Discovery Channel)
- Running time: 120 minutes
- Country: United States
- Language: English

Global Warming: What You Need to Know is a 2006 global warming (climate change) documentary, directed by Nicolas Brown, starring Tom Brokaw, James Hansen, Michael Oppenheimer, and Mark Serreze. The film focuses on impacts from climate change, and Tom Brokaw interviews scientists. The documentary premiered on Discovery Channel, 16 July 2006.
