= Henry Charnock =

British meteorologist (1920–1997)

Henry Charnock CBE FRS (25 December 1920 – 28 November 1997) was a British meteorologist. He is well known for his work on surface roughness and wind stress over water surfaces. The now named "Charnock's relationship" describes the aerodynamic roughness length, $z_0$, over a water surface by:

$z_0=C u_*^2/g$

where $u_*$ is the friction velocity and $g$ is the acceleration due to gravity (typically the Standard gravity). $C$ is Charnock's proportionality constant.

Charnock was President of the International Union of Geodesy and Geophysics (IUGG) from 1971 to 1975.

== Bibliography ==
- 'CHARNOCK, Henry’, Who Was Who, A & C Black, 1920–2008; online edn, Oxford University Press, Dec 2007
