= Expocode =

Unique alphanumeric identifier

EXPOCODE, or the "expedition code", is a unique alphanumeric identifier defined by the National Oceanographic Data Center (NODC) of the US. The code defines a standard nomenclature for cruise labels of research vessels and intends to avoid confusion in oceanographic data management.

The code was used by international projects (WOCE, CarboOcean) and is considered a de facto standard in the international hydrographic community beginning with the Climate Variability Program (CLIVAR) and the EU-Project Eurofleets.

The format of an expocode for an oceanographic cruise is defined in the format NODCYYYYMMDD where:

- NODC is NOAA's National Oceanographic Data Center's 4-character research vessel identifier, consisting of country and ship code
- YYYYMMDD is the GMT date when the cruise left port.

Example for a cruise of the US research vessel Nathaniel B. Palmer, starting on 2011-02-19: 320620110219 (Code of US = 32, code of Palmer = 06, date when cruise starts 2011-02-19)
