= International Association of Meteorology and Atmospheric Sciences =

International non-governmental organization

- Abbreviation: IAMAS
- Formation: 1919
- Type: INGO
- Region served: Worldwide
- Official language: English
- President: Andrea Flossmann, France
- Parent organization: International Union of Geodesy and Geophysics
- Website: IAMAS Official website

The International Association of Meteorology and Atmospheric Sciences (IAMAS) is a non-governmental organization promoting atmospheric sciences through conferences, workshops and publications. IAMAS and its commissions bring together experts from around the world to enhance scientific understanding and prediction of the atmosphere’s behavior and its connections to and effects on other components of the Earth’s geophysical system. IAMAS is one of eight associations of the International Union of Geodesy and Geophysics (IUGG). It was created in July 1919 as "The Meteorology Section" of IUGG and was renamed "The International Association and of Meteorology" in 1957. Since 1993, it has been called "The International Association of Meteorology and Atmospheric Sciences."

== IAMAS Commissions ==
IAMAS consists of ten commissions:

- The International Commission on Atmospheric Chemistry and Global Pollution (iCACGP)
- The International Commission on Atmospheric Electricity (ICAE)
- The International Commission on Climate (ICCL)
- The International Commission on Clouds and Precipitation (ICCP)
- The International Commission on Dynamical Meteorology (ICDM)
- The International Commission on the Middle Atmosphere (ICMA)
- The International Commission on Planetary Atmospheres and their Evolution (ICPAE)
- The International Commission on Polar Meteorology (ICPM)
- The International Ozone Commission (IOC)
- The International Radiation Commission (IRC)

== IAMAS Management ==
A Bureau comprising the President, two Vice Presidents, and the Secretary General, guided by the IAMAS statutes, deals with the management of the organization. The President of IAMAS is Andrea Flossmann, France (2023-2027). Keith Alverson, Canada/USA, is the current IAMAS-Secretary-General (2023-2027).

== Early Career Scientist Medal Award ==
The IAMAS Early Career Scientist Medal Award was established in 2011, and is presented every two years, to an awardee from candidates nominated by the commissions of IAMAS.
