= Roger G. Barry =

British-born American climatologist and geographer

Roger Graham Barry
- Born: November 13, 1935
- Died: March 19, 2018 (aged 82)
- Citizenship: British
- Education: University of Southampton
- Occupations: Geographer, climatologist
- Scientific career
- Notable students: Mark Serreze

Roger Graham Barry (13 November 1935 – 19 March 2018) was a British-born American geographer and climatologist.

He earned a doctorate from the University of Southampton in 1965 and began teaching at the University of Colorado three years later. While leading the National Snow and Ice Data Center from 1976 to 2008, Barry received a Guggenheim Fellowship in 1982, was granted a fellowship of the American Geophysical Union in 1999, and taught at Moscow State University as a Fulbright Scholar in 2001. Before leaving Russia, Barry was named a foreign member of the Russian Academy of Natural Sciences. In 2007, Barry was awarded a Founder's Medal from the Royal Geographical Society. He retired in 2010, and died on 19 March 2018, aged 82.
