= Len Cormier =

American aerospace engineer

Len Cormier (1924 – June 16, 2008) worked for many years in the U.S. aerospace industry, in government, large industry, and as a private entrepreneur. He developed many creative proposals for reusable launch vehicles, and was present at several key events of the early Space Age.

== Early life and career ==
Len Cormier was born in 1924 in Boston, Massachusetts. After learning to fly in the Second World War, he became a U.S. Navy fighter pilot, and executive officer of an ASW patrol squadron. He obtained a B.A. in physics from Berkeley in 1952. "He joined the Navy Reserve in 1947 and achieved the rank of lieutenant commander in 1958. He retired from the reserves in 1966." He spoke Russian and English.

== Involvement with the International Geophysical Year ==
In 1956 he began work at the National Academy of Sciences (NAS) of the U.S.A. As a staff member there in 1957 he was involved in work on a satellite to be launched as part of the International Geophysical Year (IGY), 1957–1958, and on publication of IGY scientific results.

He attended the October 1957 conference at which the Soviet Union hinted at the upcoming launch of Sputnik 1. According to his family, this event "made a tremendous impression on him".

In 1958 he was present at the Jan. 31[?] press conference at the National Academy of Sciences following the launch of the first US satellite, Explorer 1. While at the NAS he was also involved with the Moonwatch, Moonbeam and Phototrack volunteer groups supporting the IGY satellite program.

== Later work ==
In 1959, he moved to NASA headquarters, where he was involved with the work of the Space Science Board.

Around 1960 he left NASA to work at North American Aviation, where he was project engineer for space transportation systems at the Los Angeles Division for several years.

== Private entrepreneur ==
In 1967 Cormier formed a company called TranSpace, marking the beginning of his work on a commercial approach to spaceflight, which continued for the remainder of his life. Later TranSpace became Third Millennium Aerospace, Inc. Other companies he set up included PanAero, Inc. However Cormier struggled to obtain sufficient investment for his Space Van (and other) concepts, which underwent many revisions over the years.

Concerned with the economics of commercial space transportation with several papers on the topic published by the AIAA. Cormier was a charter member and a reappointed member of the Department of Transportation's Commercial Space Transportation Advisory Committee (COMSTAC), providing advice to the FAA.

He designed and advocated many reusable launch vehicles (RLVs):

- Space Van was intended to carry sixteen passengers, plus crew, to a 40-degree low Earth orbit for $3,000,000 per flight in 1996 dollars.
- Cormier's Bantam Boosters, Millennium Express. The smaller Bantam Van would carry a 400 kg payload. This reflected his belief a small RLV was essential to obtaining appropriate returns on investment.
- Bear Cub using a Tupolev Tu-95 "Bear" bomber as the launch platform for a liquid-fueled rocket.
- His PanAero company was an Ansari X PRIZE contestant, with their SabreRocket entry based on an existing Sabre-40 jet.
- PanAero later unsuccessfully proposed Space Van 2010 in response to NASA's COTS proposals in March 2006.

Cormier was a frequent poster to Usenet's sci.space.* and other newsgroups for more than 10 years . For his work towards low-cost reusable spaceflight he was nominated for the Heinlein Prize. Cormier died a well-respected member of the private spaceflight community on 2008-06-16, aged 82.

== Partial list of works ==
- Cormier, L. Millenium Express, AIAA 2001-3962, 37th AIAA/ASME/SAE/ASEE Joint Propulsion Conference, 8–11 July 2001, Salt Lake City, Utah.
- Cormier, L. X Van Economics, AIAA-98-3954, 34th AIAA/ASME/SAE/ASEE Joint Propulsion Conference, July 13–15, 1998, Cleveland, Ohio.
- Cormier, L. Bantam Boosters: The Key to Small RLVs?, AIAA-97-3124, 33rd AIAA/ASME/SAE/ASEE Joint Propulsion Conference, July 6–9, 1997, Washington State Convention and Trade Center, Seattle, Washington.
- Martin J.A. and Cormier L., Where profit drives RLV, AEROSPACE AMERICA ISSN 0740-722X, Vol.35, Iss. 4, pp 40–42. April 1997.
- Cormier, L. The Economics and Technical Benefits of the Assist-Stage Concept for Space Launch, AIAA-96-2773, 32nd AIAA/ASME/SAE/ASEE Joint Propulsion Conference, July 1–3, 1996, Walt Disney World Dolphin, Lake Buena Vista, Florida.
- Cormier, Leonard N. Simplified satellite prediction from modified orbital elements (Washington, National Academy of Sciences, IGY World Data Center A, Rockets and Satellites, 1959.)
- Berkner, Lloyd V., Gilman Reid, John Hanessian Jr., Leonard Cormier. Manual on rockets and satellites, vol. 6, Annals of the International Geophysical Year. (Pergamon, 1958.)
- US patent 4919366, Cormier, Leonard N., "Heat resistive wall assembly for a space vehicle", issued 1990-04-24
- US application 20090173830, Cormier, Leonard N., "Rocket-powered kite plane for gentle climb and acceleration to extreme staging altitudes", published 2009-07-09

== Awards and honors ==
- Member of the American Institute of Aeronautics and Astronautics.
- Nominated for the Heinlein Prize.
