= Operation Phototrack =

Satellite tracking program

Operation Phototrack was among the programs quickly organized in the United States, after the Soviet Earth satellite Sputnik 1 was launched on 4 October 1957, to fill the temporary tracking gap until the Baker-Nunn cameras specially designed to optically track U.S. satellites became operational. It was also referred to as the "Independent IGY (International Geophysical Year) Tracking Coordination Program".

== Use of volunteers ==
Supported by the Society of Photographic Scientists and Engineers (later the Society for Imaging Science and Technology), Phototrack enlisted volunteers who had wide-angle optical instruments with film-recording capability. Volunteers were recruited with announcements in various magazines and newspapers. Like its contemporary volunteer visual-tracking program called Moonwatch, it continued for some years as a supplement to the Baker-Nunn operation, since its results could fill in for the main system's losses due to, for example, weather problems. Also like Moonwatch, some of its volunteers were located in countries outside the U. S, such as Canada, Australia and Japan.

== Time exposure photographs ==
The photographs produced were time exposures in which a satellite's track appeared as a long, usually slightly curved, line seen against a background of stars. If the camera were stationary, the tracks of the much more slowly moving stars appeared as much shorter lines, which were portions of arcs about the pole. If the volunteer had a motor-driven polar-axis camera mount that countered the Earth's rotation, the stars were represented by dots whose sizes depended on the resolution of the camera lens and the magnitude of the star.

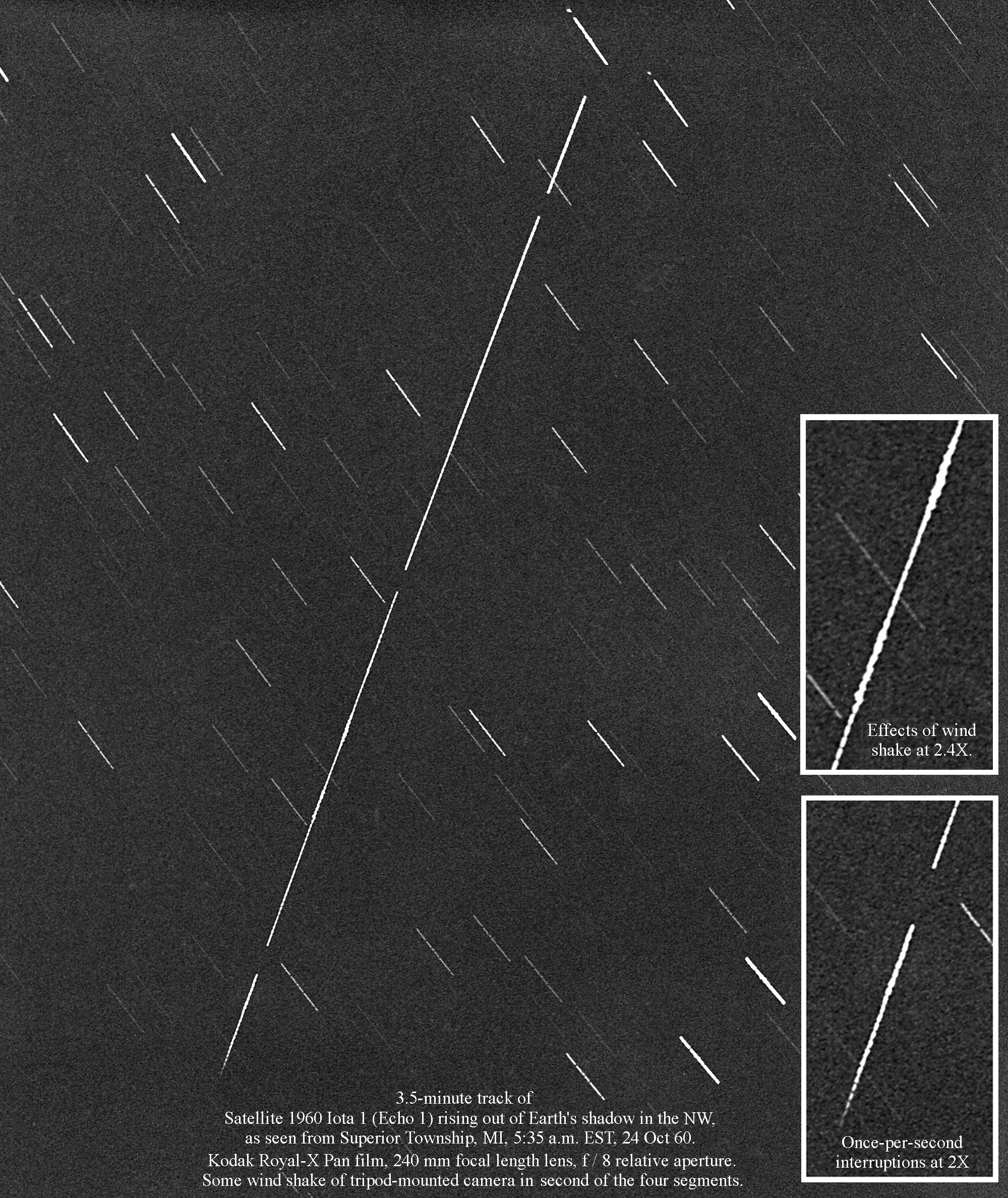
Example of some typical contents of images submitted to Operation Phototrack by participating volunteers.

With knowledge of the camera's latitude/longitude position and its elevation above sea level, both obtainable from USGS (U. S. Geological Survey) 7½-minute quadrangle maps (before the days of Global Positioning System devices), comparison of the track with the star background could define the satellite's successive positions. To correlate those positions with times, breaks in the lines were created by interrupting the exposures at times known by their relationship with radio time signals broadcast by the U. S. National Bureau of Standards.

Suitable times for making photos were when the observer's sky was dark enough to show stars but the very high altitude satellite was directly illuminated by the sun. Most such times were during the two hours before dawn or after sunset at the observer's location, but vehicles reaching sufficiently southerly or northerly latitudes were sometimes illuminated by sunlight coming over the polar regions.

== Film requirements ==
The program required negatives submitted for measurement to be at least 4 by 5 inches (over 100 by 125 mm) in size and the lens to have a focal length of at least 5 inches. The film was to be as light-sensitive a type as could be obtained on the non-professional market and strongly developed to further increase that sensitivity. Measurement of such negatives could determine the locations of multiple points along the satellite's path within 150 feet, or about 50 meters

== Project management ==
Phototrack was directed by Norton Goodwin, who was also an author, along with L. N. Cormier and R. K. Squires, of a manual for prediction of satellite observing times from modified orbital elements, in which "modified" meant earth-centered orbital elements using longitude and latitude as coordinates rather than astronomers' declination and right ascension. Procedures described in that document were to be used by program participants for making calculations to determine times and aiming directions for using their instruments.

=== Computation handbook ===
Goodwin was also the listed author of another program booklet containing tables of trigonometric functions. An unusual feature of these tables was the specification of angles in "turns", one turn being 360 degrees, or 2pi radians. They were calculated for "every tenth microturn", which referred to the ordinal tenths, not the fractional tenths. Those values, calculated on early digital computers, were made available to be used by Phototrack participants for making decimal calculations. Besides a "limited draft edition" of the computation handbook, published in August 1958, a later version was published by the National Academy of Sciences – National Research Council in January 1959 as Number 7 in its "IGY Satellite Report Series". The book of tables was also re-published by the Society of Photographic Scientists and Engineers in 1964.

=== Observer updates ===
Observers were provided with sufficiently frequent updates of the orbital parameters of known objects, based on past observations, to permit each to work out his own predictions of suitable looking times and directions for his own location. Updates were sent primarily by postal mail in the form of about weekly postcards, but some information was available by radio. The data provided on the cards were the modified orbital elements used in the handbook calculations. That being before either home computers or even electronic calculators existed, most program participants had to do their calculations, including long divisions, either manually or with mechanical calculating devices.

=== Final analysis ===
Exposed negatives containing good tracks and star backgrounds and clear time markers were sent to the program, which forwarded them to trained analysts for measurement. Although little evidence of a satellite's distance from the observing station was available from any single negative, and exposures at different stations did not occur simultaneously, combining of the results from several stations, plus accurately measurable items such as the orbital period, allowed parameters of credible smooth orbital paths to be derived.
