= ISC World Data System =

Organization

World Data System
- Abbreviation: ISC-WDS
- Formation: 2009; 17 years ago
- Type: INGO
- Headquarters: Oak Ridge, Tennessee, United States
- 2021-2024 Chair: David Castle (Canada)
- Website: worlddatasystem.org

The World Data System (WDS) was created by the International Council for Science (ICSU), the predecessor to the International Science Council (ISC), at their 29th General Assembly in October 2008. The mission of the World Data System is to enhance the capabilities, impact and sustainability of member data repositories and data services by creating trusted communities of scientific data repositories, strengthening the scientific enterprise throughout the entire lifecycle of all data related components - creating first-class data that feeds first-class research output, and advocating for accessible data and transparent and reproducible science.

The World Data System consists of two offices: the International Program Office (IPO) in Oak Ridge, Tennessee, United States, and the International Technology Office (ITO) in Victoria, Canada.

== Historical Background ==
WDS builds on the 50+ years legacy of the World Data Centers and Federation of Astronomical and Geophysical Data Analysis Services established by the International Council for Science (ICSU) to manage data generated by the International Geophysical Year (1957–1958). It became clear after the International Polar Year (2007–2008) that these bodies could not respond fully to modern data needs. Consequently, they were disbanded by the ICSU General Assembly in 2008 and replaced by the World Data System in 2009.

== Governance ==
The World Data System is governed by the Scientific Committee (SC) composed of leading scientists and experts actively involved with data. Per the WDS Constitution (Annex 1), the SC consists of a Chairperson and no more than eleven additional members. Committee members are elected to serve for a term of three-year, renewable once. The current SC composition is listed on WDS’s website.

== Offices ==
The International Program Office was established in 2011 and formally inaugurated in 2012, hosted by the Japanese National Institute of Information and Communications Technology (NICT) in Tokyo, Japan. The hosting agreement was renewed in 2015 to continue operating the IPO through 2021. In 2021, the office moved to Oak Ridge, Tennessee, United States and is hosted by the University of Tennessee Oak Ridge Innovation Institute (UT-ORII) located at Oak Ridge National Laboratory (ORNL). The office is funded through a grant from the U.S. Department of Energy Office of Science (DE-SC0021915). The IPO coordinates the operations of WDS and is responsible for implementing the decisions of the Scientific Committee.

The International Technology Office was established in 2018 in Victoria, Canada with the office housed on the University of Victoria’s Queenswood campus. It is hosted by a Canadian consortium of three WDS members: Ocean Networks Canada (ONC) at the University of Victoria, the Canadian Astronomy Data Centre (CADC) of the National Research Council (NRC) in Victoria, and the Canadian Cryospheric Information Network/Polar Data Catalogue (CCIN/PDC) at the University of Waterloo. The ITO was formed with the mission to build trustworthy and enduring global research data infrastructure for the public good. They support repositories as they maintain and upgrade their services, including the creation of technical roadmaps and mature infrastructure. It is responsible for developing research to support technical services for repositories, including creating user interfaces, crosswalks, and complex queries.

== Data Sharing Principles ==
The WDS Data Sharing Principles are in line with the data policies of national and international initiatives, including those of the Group on Earth Observations, the G8 Science Ministers’ Statement and Open Data Charter, the OECD Principles and Guidelines for Access to Research Data from Public Funding, as well as the Science International Accord on Open Data in a Big Data World enunciated jointly by the International Science Council—then separately, the International Council for Science and the International Social Science Council—the InterAcademy Panel, and the World Academy of Science.

- Data, metadata, products, and information should be fully and openly shared, subject to national or international jurisdictional laws and policies, including respecting appropriate extant restrictions, and in accordance with international standards of ethical research conduct.
- Data, metadata, products, and information produced for research, education, and public domain use will be made available with minimum time delay and free of charge, or for no more than the cost of dissemination, which may be waived for lower-income user communities to support equity in access.
- All who produce, share, and use data and metadata are stewards of those data and ensure that the data’s authenticity, quality, and integrity are preserved. Respect for the data source is maintained by ensuring privacy where appropriate and encouraging appropriate citation of the dataset and original work and acknowledgment of the data repository.
- Data should be open by default and labeled ‘sensitive’ or ‘restricted’ only with appropriate justification and clearly defined protocols. They should, in any event, be made available for use on the least restrictive basis possible.
- Data should be treated with integrity and confidentiality and treated with the security requested by the data steward and producers.
- To the greatest extent possible, data and data repositories should follow the best data management and stewardship practices, such as the FAIR Principles for scientific data management and stewardship, the TRUST Principles for Data Repositories, and the CARE Principles for Indigenous Data Governance.

== Members ==
World Data System membership is open to organizations that operate as data repositories, networks of data repositories, data stewards, and organizations that support data repositories and research data best practices. All members must adhere to the WDS Data Sharing Principles, Constitution, and Bylaws. In addition, Regular Members must show proof of CoreTrustSeal certification.

There are five different kinds of membership within the World Data System. A map and directory of membership is available online.

- Regular: organizations that are data stewards and/or data analysis services (e.g., data centers and services that support scientific research by holding and providing data or data products)
- Network: umbrella bodies representing groups of data stewardship organizations and/or data analysis services, some of which may or may not be WDS Regular Members. Network Members usually serve as coordinating agents for nodes that have common characteristics and mostly common disciplines (e.g., International Oceanographic Data and Information Exchange)
- Partner: organizations that are not data stewards or data analysis services, but that contribute support or funding to WDS and/or WDS Members (e.g., International Scientific Unions of ISC supporting data services, and public and private agencies that provide technical or financial support)
- Associate: organizations that are interested in the WDS endeavor and participate in our discussions, but that do not contribute direct funding or other material support (ISC National Members, Academies, and some commercial entities could be in this category)
- Candidate: organizations who wish to become Regular Members, but who currently do not have all processes and documentation in place to undergo CoreTrustSeal certification. Candidate membership is a sign of commitment that an organization will become a certified CoreTrustSeal Trustworthy Data Repository and an accredited WDS Regular Member
