= Vladimir Belousov =

A Soviet Earth scientist known for alternatives to plate tectonics

- Born: Vladimir Vladimirovich Belousov; 30 October [O.S. 17 October] 1907
- Died: December 25, 1990 (aged 83)
- Scientific career
- Fields: Geology
- Workplaces: Institute of the Physics of the Earth; Moscow State University

Vladimir Vladimirovich Belousov (Russian: Влади́мир Влади́мирович Белоу́сов) (30 October [O.S. 17 October] 1907 in Moscow – December 25, 1990) was an Earth scientist in the Soviet Union, and a prominent advocate of alternatives to the theories of plate tectonics and seafloor spreading during the period of intense debate on these subjects in the 20th century.

Belousov was head of the Geodynamics Department at the Institute of the Physics of the Earth in Moscow (from 1944). He was a corresponding member of the Academy of Sciences of the Soviet Union (from 1953), and a professor at both the Moscow Geological Surveyance Institute (from 1943) and Moscow State University (from 1953). From 1960 to 1963, Belousov was President of the International Union of Geodesy and Geophysics (IUGG). Additionally, he was also a Foreign Member of the Geological Society of London.

In 1942, Belousov advanced the theory that the Earth's material had gradually differentiated according to its density, leading to the current internal structure of the Earth. He proposed that this gradual movement was the basic cause of movements in the Earth's crust.

During the 1960s, he led three expeditions to the East African Rift to study continental structure and the Earth's mantle. These trips fueled his belief that continental crust was transformed into oceanic crust through widespread processes involving basic magmas.

Although his theories were ultimately rejected by the scientific community, Belousov was an important figure in the development of the Earth sciences within the Soviet union following the Second World War.

== Bibliography ==
=== Papers in English ===
- Belousov V.V. The upper mantle project: World scientists join in a great venture. - The Courier UNESCO. 1963. N 10. P. 12–17.
- Belousov V.V. The upper mantle and its influence on the development of the Earth's crust. - JCSU Review of world science. 1964. Vol. 6. P. 72–77.
- Belousov V.V. The relationship between the Earth's crust and the deeper layers of the Earth. - Joum. Indian Geoph. Union. 1965. Vol. 1, N 1. P. 1–7; Ibid. Vol. 2, N 2. P. 81–86.
- Belousov V.V. Modern concepts of the structure and development of the Earth's crust and the upper mantle of continents. - Quart. Journ. Geol. soc. London. 1966. Vol. 122. Pt. 3. N 487. P. 293–314; Ibid. - Journ. Geol. soc. India. 1966. Vol. 7. P. 1–14.
- Belousov V.V. Against continental drift. - Science Journ. 1967. Vol. 3. N 1. P. 2–7.
- Belousov V.V. Some comments on possible processes in the Earth's mantle. - J. R. astr. soc. 1967. Vol. 14. N 1–4. P. 371–373.
- Belousov V.V. Structural geology. M.: Mir, 1968. 180 p.
- Belousov V.V. Some problems of development of the Earth‘s crust and upper mantle of oceans // The Crust and Upper Mantle of the Pacific Area. Washington:, AGU, 1968. P. 449–459. (Geophysical Monograph Series; Vol 12)
- Belousov V.V. Interrelations between the Earth's crust and upper mantle. - The Earth's crust and upper mantle. Am. Geoph. Union, 1969. P. 698–712.
- Belousov V.V. Against the hypothesis of ocean-floor spreading. - Tectonophysics. 1970. Vol. 9. N 6. P. 489–511.
- Belousov V.V. On possible forms of relationship between magmatism and tectonogenesis // Journ. Geol. Soc. 1971. Vol. 127. N 1. P. 57–68.
- Belousov V.V. Conference reports: IUGS Symposium “Geodynamics Problems-Outlook to the 80's” [Zurich. Feb. 5–6. 1979]. Episodes. Vol. 2. N 1. 1979. P. 30.
- Belousov V.V. Geotectonics. Moscow; Berlin; New York: Mir; Springer; Heidelberg, 1980. 330 p.
