= International Geophysical Year =

18-month collaboration in Earth sciences (1957–1958)

Official emblem of the IGY

The International Geophysical Year (IGY; French: Année géophysique internationale), also referred to as the third International Polar Year, was an international scientific project that lasted from 1 July 1957 to 31 December 1958. It marked the end of a long period during the Cold War when scientific interchange between East and West had been seriously interrupted. Sixty-seven countries participated in IGY projects, although one notable exception was the mainland People's Republic of China, which was protesting against the participation of the Republic of China (Taiwan). East and West agreed to nominate the Belgian Marcel Nicolet as secretary general of the associated international organization.

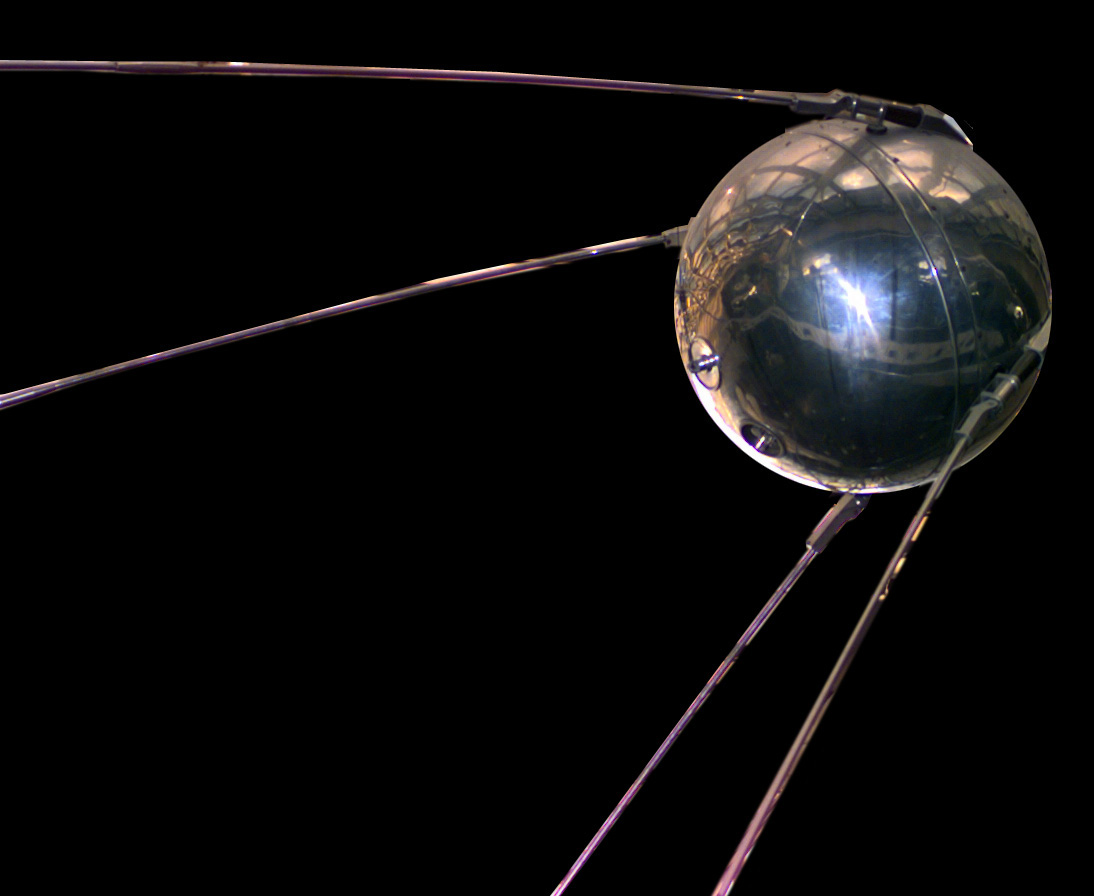
A replica of Sputnik 1, which was launched into orbit on October 4, 1957

The IGY encompassed fourteen Earth science disciplines: aurora, airglow, cosmic rays, geomagnetism, gravity, ionospheric physics, longitude and latitude determinations (precision mapping), meteorology, oceanography, nuclear radiation, glaciology, seismology, rockets and satellites, and solar activity. The timing of the IGY was particularly suited for studying some of these phenomena, since it covered the peak of solar cycle 19. One of the most ambitious global programmes of scientific research in the 20th century, it involved over 60,000 scientists from 67 countries assigned to research.

The Soviet Union and the U.S. both launched artificial satellites during the IGY; the Soviet Union's Sputnik 1, launched on October 4, 1957, was the first successful artificial satellite. Other significant achievements of the IGY included the discovery of the Van Allen radiation belts by Explorer 1 and mid-ocean submarine ridges, an important confirmation of plate-tectonic theory. Research bases were established in Antarctica, many of which have been maintained to the present day, including at the South Pole. The IGY also spurred early research at Mauna Loa Observatory in Hawaii, established in June, 1956.

== History ==
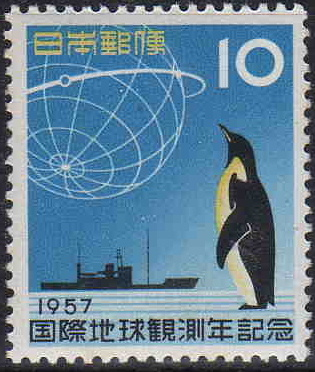
A commemorative stamp issued by Japan in 1957 to mark the IGY. The illustration depicts the Japanese Research Ship Sōya and a penguin.

The origin of the International Geophysical Year can be traced to the International Polar Years held in 1882–1883, then in 1932–1933 (and, most recently from March 2007 to March 2009). On 5 April 1950, multiple scientists (including Lloyd Berkner, Sydney Chapman, S. Fred Singer, and Harry Vestine) met in James Van Allen's living room and suggested that the time was ripe to have a worldwide Geophysical Year instead of a Polar Year, especially considering recent advances in rocketry, radar, and computing. Berkner and Chapman proposed to the International Council of Scientific Unions that an International Geophysical Year (IGY) be planned for 1957–58, coinciding with an approaching period of maximum solar activity. In 1952, the IGY was announced. Joseph Stalin's death in 1953 opened the way for international collaboration with the Soviet Union.

In 1952 the Comité Spécial de l'Année Géophysique Internationale (CSAGI), a special committee of the ICSU, was established to coordinate the International Geophysical Year (IGY) under president Sydney Chapman, a British geophysicist.

== Events ==
On 29 July 1955, James C. Hagerty, president Dwight D. Eisenhower's press secretary, announced that the United States intended to launch "small Earth circling satellites" between 1 July 1957 and 31 December 1958 as part of the United States contribution to the International Geophysical Year (IGY). Project Vanguard would be managed by the Naval Research Laboratory and to be based on developing sounding rockets, which had the advantage that they were primarily used for non-military scientific experiments.

Four days later, at the Sixth Congress of International Astronautical Federation in Copenhagen, scientist Leonid I. Sedov spoke to international reporters at the Soviet embassy and announced his country's intention to launch a satellite in the "near future".

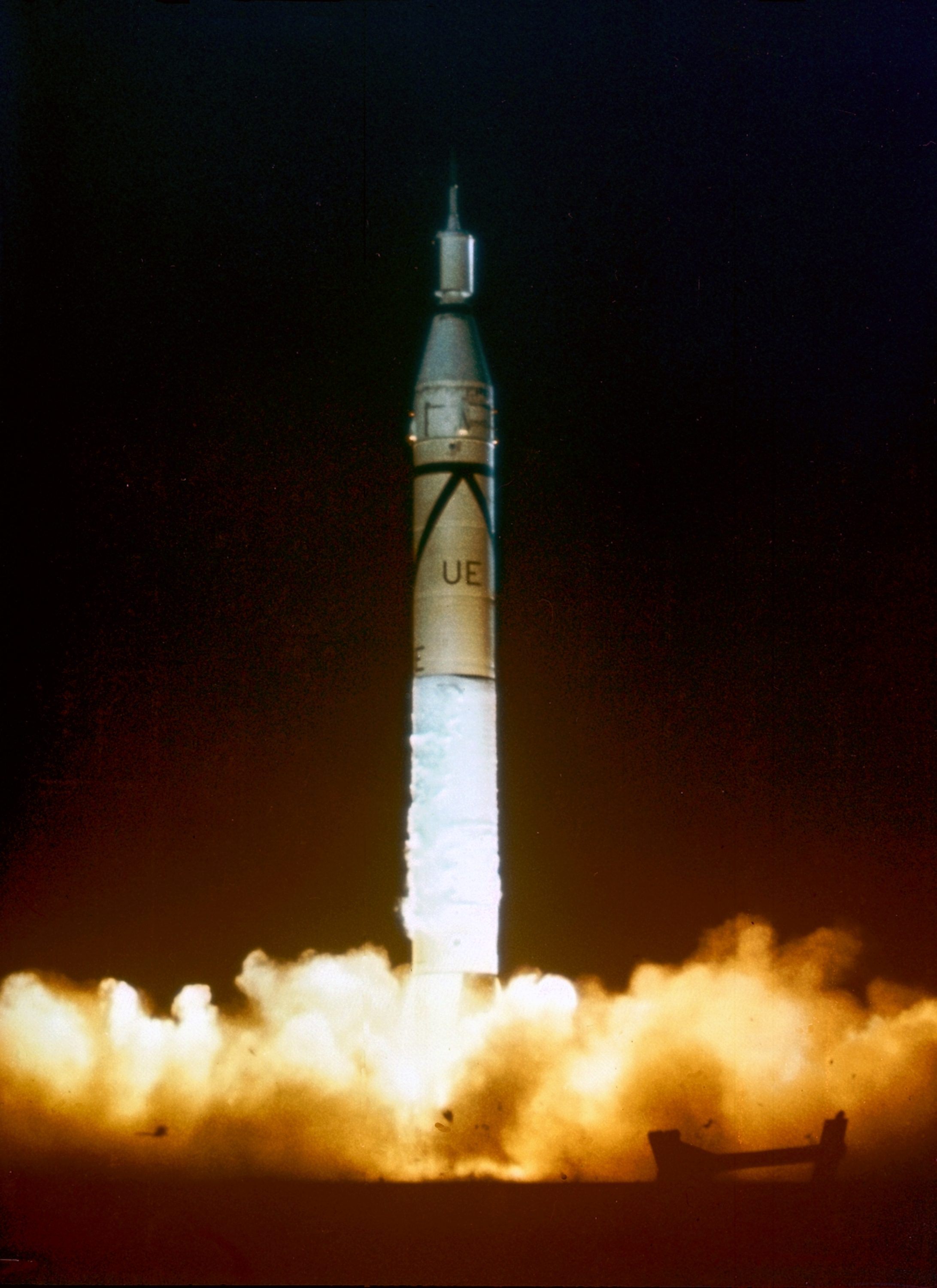
The launch of the satellite Explorer 1 on February 1, 1958

To the surprise of many, the USSR launched Sputnik 1 as the first artificial Earth satellite on 4 October 1957. After several failed Vanguard launches, Wernher von Braun and his team convinced President Dwight D. Eisenhower to use one of their US Army missiles for the Explorer program (there was not yet an inhibition about using military rockets to get into space). On 8 November 1957, the US Secretary of Defense instructed the US Army to use a modified Jupiter-C rocket to launch a satellite. The US achieved this goal only four months later with Explorer 1, on 1 February 1958, but after Sputnik 2 on 3 November 1957, making Explorer 1 the third artificial Earth satellite. Vanguard 1 became the fourth, launched on 17 March 1958. The Soviet launches would be followed by considerable political consequences, one of which was the creation of the US space agency NASA on 29 July 1958.

The British–American survey of the Atlantic, carried out between September 1954 and July 1959, discovered the full length of the mid-Atlantic ridges (plate tectonics); it was a major discovery during the IGY.

== World Data Centers ==
Although the 1932 Polar Year accomplished many of its goals, it fell short on others because of the advance of World War II. In fact, because of the war, much of the data collected and scientific analyses completed during the 1932 Polar Year were lost forever, something that was particularly troubling to the IGY organizing committee. The committee resolved that "all observational data shall be available to scientists and scientific institutions in all countries." They felt that without the free exchange of data across international borders, there would be no point in having an IGY.

In April 1957, just three months before the IGY began, scientists representing the various disciplines of the IGY established the World Data Center system. The United States hosted World Data Center "A" and the Soviet Union hosted World Data Center "B". World Data Center "C" was subdivided among countries in Western Europe, Australia, and Japan. NOAA hosted seven of the fifteen World Data Centers in the United States.

Each World Data Center would eventually archive a complete set of IGY data to deter losses prevalent during the International Polar Year of 1932. Each World Data Center was equipped to handle many different data formats, including computer punch cards and tape—the original computer media. In addition, each host country agreed to abide by the organizing committee's resolution that there should be a free and open exchange of data among nations. ICSU-WDS goals are to preserve quality-assured scientific data and information, to facilitate open access, and promote the adoption of standards. ICSU World Data System created in 2008 superseded the World Data Centers (WDCs) and Federation of Astronomical and Geophysical data analysis Services (FAGS) created by ICSU to manage data generated by the International Geophysical Year.

== Antarctica ==
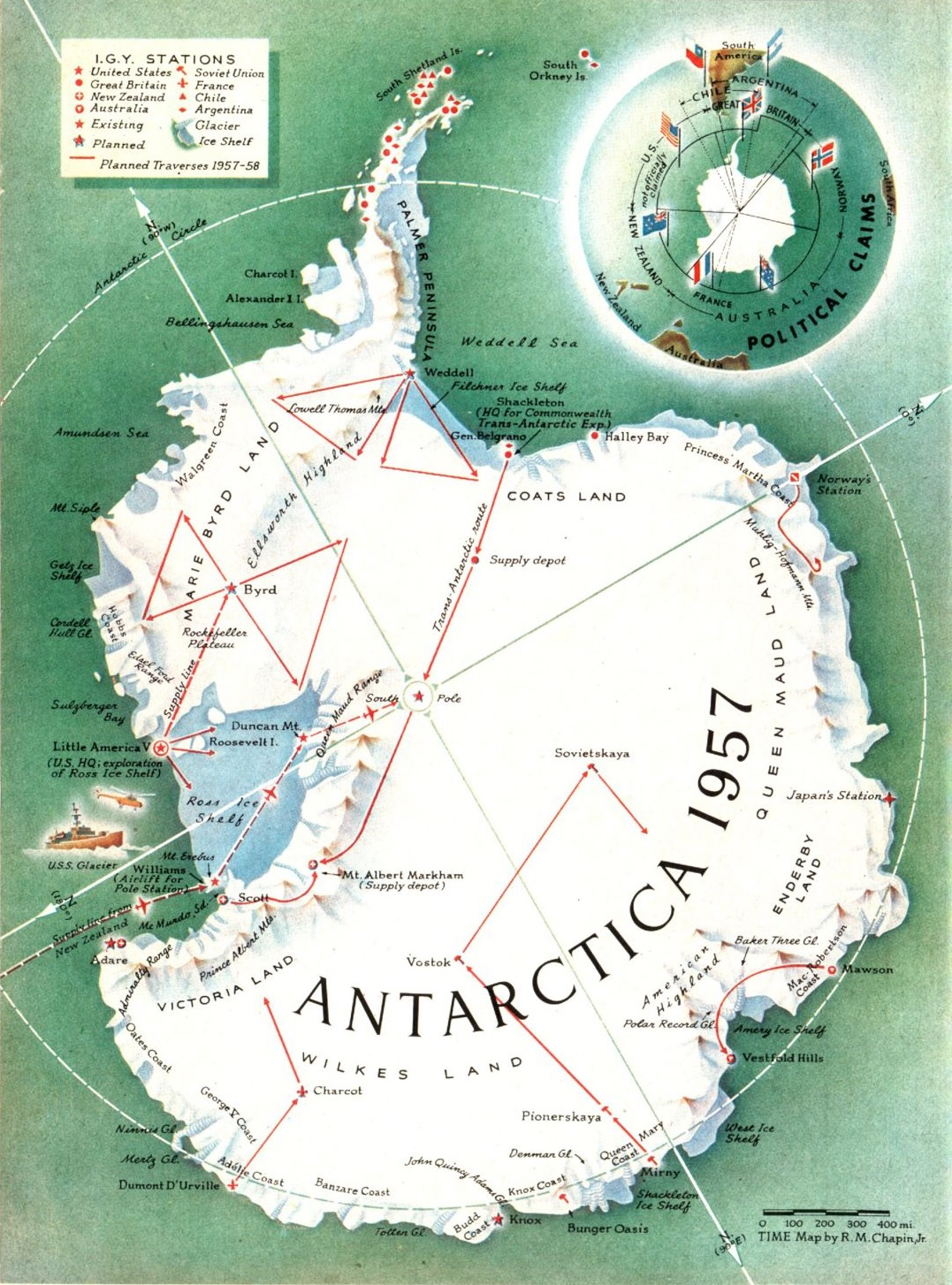
IGY Antarctica infographic

The IGY triggered an 18-month year of Antarctic science. The International Council of Scientific Unions, a parent body, broadened the proposals from polar studies to geophysical research. More than 70 existing national scientific organizations then formed IGY committees, and participated in the cooperative effort.

Australia established its first permanent base on the Antarctic continent at Mawson in 1954. It is now the longest continuously operating station south of the Antarctic Circle. Davis was added in 1957, in the Vestfold Hills, 400 miles (640 km) east of Mawson. The wintering parties for the IGY numbered 29 at Mawson and 4 at Davis, all male. (Both stations now have 16 to 18 winterers, including both sexes.) As a part of the IGY activities, a two-man camp was installed beside Taylor Glacier, 60 miles (97 km) west of Mawson. Its principal purpose was to enable parallactic photography of the aurora australis (thus locating it in space), but it also permitted studies of Emperor penguins in the adjacent rookery.

Two years later, Australia took over the running of Wilkes, a station built for the IGY by the United States. When Wilkes rapidly deteriorated from snow and ice accumulation, plans were made to build Casey Station, known as Repstat ("replacement station"). Opened in 1969, Repstat was replaced by present-day Casey station in 1988.

Halley Research Station was founded in 1956 for the IGY by an expedition from the (British) Royal Society. The bay where the expedition set up their base was named Halley Bay, after the astronomer Edmond Halley.

Showa Station, the first Japanese base in Antarctica, was set up in January 1957, supported by the ice breaker Sōya. When the ship returned a year later, it became beset offshore (stuck in the sea-ice). It was eventually freed with the assistance of the US icebreaker Burton Island but could not resupply the station. The 1957 winterers were retrieved by helicopter, but bad weather prevented going back for the station's 15 sled dogs, which were left chained up. When the ship returned a year later, two of the dogs, Taro and Jiro, were still alive. They had escaped the dogline and survived by killing Adélie penguins in a nearby rookery (which were preserved by the low temperature). The two dogs became instant national heroes in Japan. A Japanese movie about this story was made in 1983, Antarctica.

France contributed Dumont d'Urville Station and Charcot Station in Adélie Land. As a forerunner expedition, the ship Commandant Charcot of the French Navy spent nine months of 1949/50 at the coast of Adelie Land. The first French station, Port Martin, was completed 9 April 1950, but destroyed by fire the night of 22 to 23 January 1952.

Belgium established the King Baudouin Base in 1958. The expedition was led by Gaston de Gerlache, son of Adrien de Gerlache who had led the 1897–1899 Belgian Antarctic Expedition. In December 1958, four team members were stranded several hundred kilometers inland when one of the skis on their light aircraft broke on landing. After a ten-day ordeal, they were rescued by an IL-14 aircraft after a flight of 1,940 miles (3,100 km) from the Soviet base, Mirny Station.

The Amundsen–Scott South Pole Station was erected as the first permanent structure at the South Pole in January 1957. It survived intact for 53 years, but was slowly buried in the ice (as all structures there eventually sink into the icy crust), until it was demolished in December 2010 for safety reasons.

== Arctic ==
Ice Skate 2 was a floating research station constructed and staffed by U.S. scientists. It mapped the bottom of the Arctic Ocean. Zeke Langdon was a meteorologist on the project. Ice Skate 2 was planned to be staffed in 6 month shifts, but due to soft ice surfaces for landing some crew members were stationed for much longer. At one point they lost all communications with anyone over their radios for one month except the expedition on the North Pole. At another point the ice sheet broke up and their fuel tanks started floating away from the base. They had to put pans under the plane engines as soon as they landed as any oil spots would go straight through the ice in the intense sunshine. Their only casualty was a man who got too close to the propeller with the oil pan.

Norbert Untersteiner was the project leader for Drifting Station Alpha and in 2008 produced and narrated a documentary about the project for the National Snow and Ice Data Center.

== Participating countries ==
The participating countries for the IGY included the following:

- Argentina
- Australia
- Austria
- Belgium
- Bolivia
- Brazil
- Bulgaria
- Burma
- Canada
- Ceylon
- Chile
- Colombia
- Cuba
- Czechoslovakia
- Denmark
- Dominican Republic
- Ecuador
- Egypt
- Ethiopia
- Finland
- France
- Germany, East
- Germany, West
- Ghana
- Greece
- Guatemala
- Hungary
- Iceland
- India
- Indonesia
- Iran
- Ireland
- Israel
- Italy
- Japan
- Korea, North
- Malaya
- Mexico
- Mongolia
- Morocco
- Netherlands
- New Zealand
- Norway
- Pakistan
- Panama
- Peru
- Philippines
- Poland
- Portugal
- Rhodesia and Nyasaland
- Romania
- South Africa
- Soviet Union
- Spain
- Sweden
- Switzerland
- Taiwan
- Thailand
- Tunisia
- United Kingdom
  - Kenya
  - Tanganyika
  - Uganda
- United States
- Uruguay
- Venezuela
- Vietnam, North
- Vietnam, South
- Yugoslavia

== Legacy ==
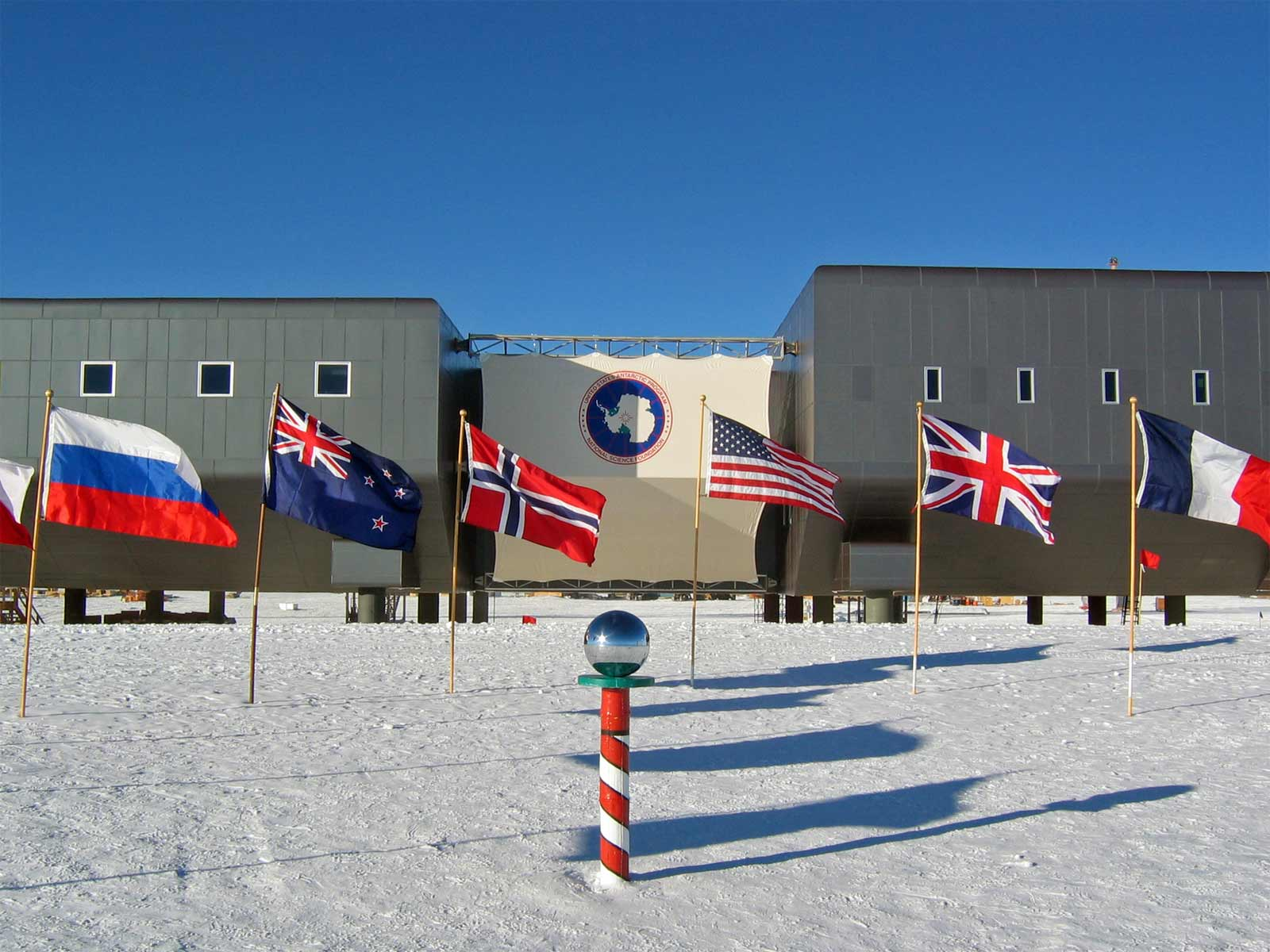
IGY legacies: The ceremonial south pole in 2007

In the end, the IGY was a resounding success, and it led to advancements that live on today. For example, the work of the IGY led directly to the Antarctic Treaty, which called for the use of Antarctica for peaceful purposes and cooperative scientific research. Since then, international cooperation has led to protecting the Antarctic environment, preserving historic sites, and conserving the animals and plants. Today, 41 nations have signed the Treaty and international collaborative research continues.

The ICSU World Data System (WDS) was created by the 29th General Assembly of the International Council for Science (ICSU) and builds on the 50-year legacy of the former ICSU World Data Centres (WDCs) and former Federation of Astronomical and Geophysical data-analysis Services (FAGS).

This World Data System, hosts the repositories for data collected during the IGY. Seven of the 15 World Data Centers in the United States are co-located at NOAA National Data Centers or at NOAA affiliates. These ICSU Data Centers not only preserve historical data, but also promote research and ongoing data collection.

The fourth International Polar Year on 2007–2008 focused on climate change and its effects on the polar environment. Sixty countries participated in this effort and it included studies in the Arctic and Antarctic.

== In popular culture ==
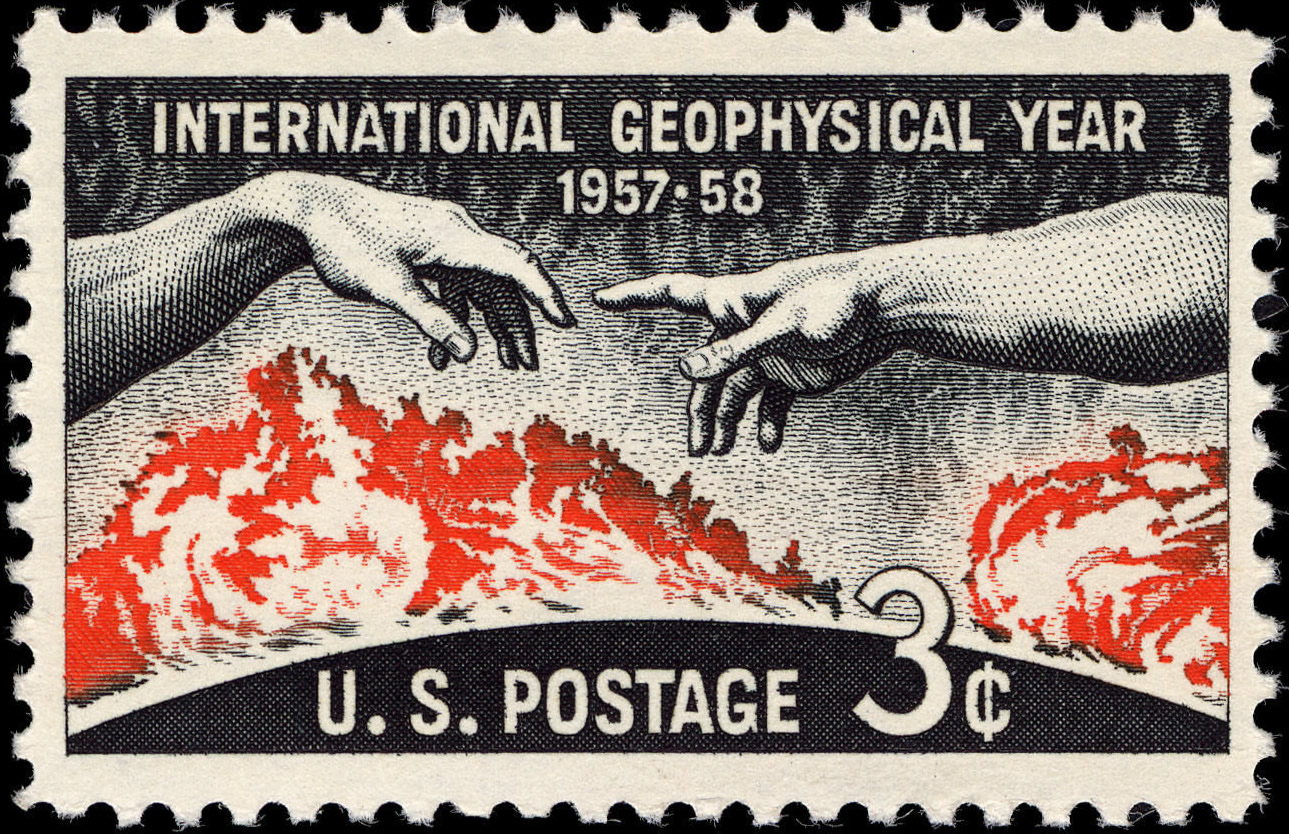
A United States 1958 three-cent Stamp for the Geophysical Year

- "I.G.Y. (What a Beautiful World)" is a track on Donald Fagen's 1982 album, The Nightfly. The song is sung from an optimistic viewpoint during the IGY, and features references to then-futuristic concepts, such as solar power (first used in 1958), Spandex (invented in 1959), space travel for entertainment, and an undersea international high-speed rail. The song peaked at #26 on the Billboard Hot 100 on 27 November – 11 December 1982 and was nominated for a Grammy Award for song of the year.
- The IGY is featured prominently in a 1957–1958 run of Pogo comic strips by Walt Kelly. The characters in the strip refer to the scientific initiative as the "G.O. Fizzickle Year". During this run, the characters try to make their own contributions to scientific endeavours, such as putting a flea on the moon. Compilations of the strips were published by Simon & Schuster SC in 1958 as G.O. Fizzickle Pogo and later Pogo's Will Be That Was in 1979. The run was also included in Pogo: The Complete Daily & Sunday Comic Strips Vol. 5: Out of This World at Home published by Fantagraphics in 2018.
- Jazz saxophonist and composer Gil Mellé recorded a "Dedicatory Piece to the Geo-Physical Year of 1957" for his album Primitive Modern, released by Prestige Records.
- The IGY was featured in a cartoon by Russell Brockbank in Punch magazine in November 1956. It shows the three main superpowers, the UK, USA, and USSR at the South Pole, each with a gathering of penguins which they are trying to educate with "culture". The penguins in the British camp are being bored by an earnest British Council lecture entitled "Shakespeare, Marlowe or Bacon?"; in the American camp they are happily demonstrating what is described as "the American way of life" by playing baseball, dancing, and getting drunk; while the Russian camp resembles a gulag with barbed-wire fences, where the penguins are made to march and perform military manoeuvres, endure indoctrination, and drag heavy ice sleds under pain of the lash.
- The Alistair MacLean novel Night Without End takes place in and around an IGY research station in Greenland.
- The IGY features in two episodes of the 1960–61 season of the documentary television series Expedition!: "The Frozen Continent" and "Man's First Winter at the South Pole".

== See also ==
- International Biological Program
- International Year of Planet Earth
- List of Antarctic expeditions
- Mauna Loa Observatory
- Baker-Nunn satellite tracking camera
- Operation Moonwatch
- Operation Phototrack
- Sulphur Mountain Cosmic Ray Station

== References and sources ==
Sources

- University of Saskatchewan Archives
- History of ionosondes, at the U.K.'s Rutherford Appleton Laboratory
- History of arctic exploration
- James Van Allen, From High School to the Beginning of the Space Era: A Biographical Sketch by George Ludwig
- Fraser, Ronald. (1957). Once Round the Sun: The Story of the International Geophysical Year, 1957–58. London, England: Hodder and Stroughton Limited.
- Schefter, James (1999). The Race: The uncensored story of how America beat Russia to the Moon. New York: Doubleday. ISBN 0385492537.
- Sullivan, Walter. (1961). Assault on the Unknown: The International Geophysical Year. New York, New York: McGraw-Hill Book Company.
- Wilson, J. Tuzo. (1961). IGY: The Year of the New Moons. New York, New York: Alfred A. Knopf, Inc.
