= Charles Jean-Pierre Lallemand =

French geophysicist

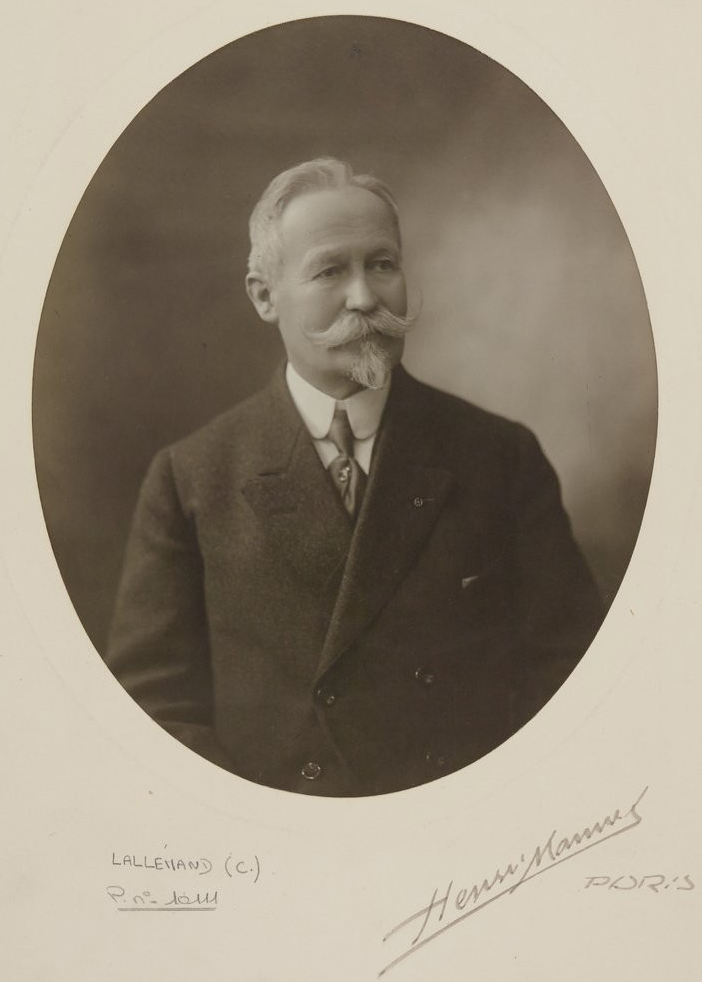
Charles Jean-Pierre Lallemand

Charles Jean-Pierre Lallemand (1857-1938) was a French geophysicist. He was elected a member of the French Academy of Sciences in 1910. He was the first president of the International Union of Geodesy and Geophysics He was also president of the Société astronomique de France (the French astronomical society), from 1923 to 1925.

== Biography ==
He is best known for the role he played in the history of General levelling of France, where he is director of the service. A former student of the École polytechnique and the École des Mines, he was elected a member of the French Academy of Sciences in 1910 and president of the French Association for the Advancement of Science in 1912.

Lallemand was elected by acclamation as the first president of the newly created International Geodetic and Geophysical Union in 1919. He was president of the Société astronomique de France (SAF) from 1923 to 1925 .

He improved Paul-Adrien Bourdaloue leveling network and refined level 0, which he set at 0.329 m on the Marseille tide gauge scale, compared to 0.4 m previously.

He is also the inventor of the tide gauge, a device used to measure the average height of Tide.

Commanding officer Nicolas Arthur Lallemand (1859–1946) was his brother.

== Honors and awards ==
- Commander of the Order of Legion of Honour
- Grand Officer of the Military Order of Saint James of the Sword

== Bibliography ==
- Notice biographique des Annales des Mines
