= International Association of Cryospheric Sciences =

Non-governmental organization

- IACS
- Abbreviation: IACS
- Formation: 2007; 19 years ago
- Type: INGO
- Region served: Worldwide
- Official language: English
- President: Liss M. Andreassen, Norway
- Parent organization: International Union of Geodesy and Geophysics
- Website: cryosphericsciences.org

The International Association of Cryospheric Sciences (IACS) is the eighth association of the International Union of Geodesy and Geophysics (IUGG). It was launched by the IUGG Council on 4 July 2007, developing from the International Commission of Snow and Ice of the International Association of Hydrological Sciences (IAHS) via the transitional Union Commission for the Cryospheric Sciences (UCCS).

Formation of this new Association is recognition of the importance of the cryospheric sciences in the study of Earth system science, and particularly at a time of significant global change. IACS has historic connections going back to the establishment of the Commission Internationale des Glaciers (International Glacier Commission) in 1894.

The broad objectives of IACS are:

- to promote studies of the cryosphere;
- to encourage research on cryospheric sciences through collaboration;
- to foster discussion and publication of results of cryospheric research;
- to promote education about the cryosphere;
- to facilitate standardisation of cryospheric measurements; and
- to promote the science of Permanent Services under IACS responsibility

(at present IACS has responsibility within the International Council of Science for the World Glacier Monitoring Service (WGMS)).

IACS is structured around a number of disciplinary Divisions. Currently these are:

- Snow and Avalanches;
- Glaciers;
- Ice Sheets;
- Sea Ice, Lake and River Ice;
- Cryosphere, Atmosphere and Climate;
- Planetary and other Ices of the Solar System.

A number of working groups under these Divisions address scientific problems of the cryosphere that are timely and well constrained. Recent examples include a working group on "Intercomparison of Forest Snow Process Models", and working groups that have developed a new "International Classification for Seasonal Snow on the Ground" and a new "Glossary of Mass Balance and Related Terms".

== See also ==
- International Glaciological Society
