= Robert Cormier (colonist) =

Robert Cormier (c. 1610 – 1712) was a ship's carpenter who typified the French colonizer of Acadia.

== From the Old World to the New ==
Robert Cormier was born in the Poitou region of France. About 1634, he married Marie Peraude (Perreau) at La Rochelle. They had two sons, Thomas born in 1636 and Jean in 1643. Like most migrants from France to New France and Acadia, Robert arrived as part of an employment contract for a term of three years. These contracts were different in nature from the indentured servant contracts used in the English colonies. Robert's contract in translation reads as follows:

"Robert Cormier's contract signed in La Rochelle on January 8, 1644 and by which Robert Cormier, vessel's carpenter, Marie Perraude, his wife and Thomas Cormier, elder son, dwelling in this city, shall be compelled as they are promising, to get on the first day upon the first request, aboard the ship le Petit Saint Pierre, of which Pierre Boileau is the master and to go in Cape Breton Island, New France Country and to work for Sieurs Tuffet, Duchanin and deChevery as vessel carpenter and to do other things which could be ordered by Sieur Louis Tuffet, commander of Fort Saint Pierre in the said island and to this end, they shall be compelled to obey and carry the orders during the three next and consecutive years, commencing on the day of their embarkation and ending on the day they will re-embark for their return, the said three years done and over. And this for and on condition that for each year they will receive the sum of one hundred and twenty Tour’s pounds, having already received in advance the payment of the first year made by the said Sieurs Tuffet, Duchanin and deChevery and the balance will be paid or made to their order five months after the return of said ship, deducting for what they will have received in the said island and it is understood that in case the said Cormier and his spouse do not obey or revolt against the said Sieur Tuffet and/or other governor's clerks, they shall be deprived of their wages in whole and kept responsible for all damages and interests. The said parties for the accomplishment of these agreements, having assigned one another all their present and future belongings, and real estate, made in LaRochelle, this Eight day of January 1644. Attorney Francois Marcoux and clerical secretary Martin deHarrabilague, both residing in this city.”

== Colonial life ==
The outposts in Acadia were originally very small fur-trading posts. When Cardinal Richelieu authorized a stronger French presence in the New World, he commissioned Isaac de Razilly to be lieutenant-general of Acadia.

French administrators, including nearby Port Royal's lord, the Sieur Charles de Menou d'Aulnay, thought little of the colonists' reclaiming tidal marshlands. Denys was very impressed with the "great extent of meadows which the sea used to cover and which the Sieur d’Aulay has drained". It was this extensive system of dikes and wooden drainage sluices (called aboiteaux) that set this colony apart from any others. It allowed the colonists to reclaim land that the Mi'kmaq nation had no use for. This greatly aided peaceful co-existence with their neighbors, and Mi'kmaq trade, friendship and intermarriage was and is an immensely important part of the Acadian identity and heritage.

It was to a more well-established settlement in Port Royal that Robert took his family to settle in 1650. Once the family was established, it wasn't certain that Robert and Marie stayed at the colony or eventually returned to France. His son Thomas appears in the 1671 census as a carpenter at Port Royal, aged 35, married to Magdelaine Girouard, with a 2-year-old daughter and possessing 7 cattle, 7 sheep and 6 arpents (2 ha) of land. This shows a typical early colonial holding, capable of sustaining a small family.

Rather than sprawling the colony outward, the Acadians established villages in several distinct core areas, such as the Minas Basin and Beaubassin. It was to Beaubassin that Thomas Cormier moved his family along with others. The 1686 census shows him and his wife now with 9 children, 4 guns, 40 arpents (14 ha) of land, 30 cattle, 10 sheep and 15 hogs. This is considerably more holding than a French peasant could hope for in Old World France.

== Legacy ==
Robert Cormier's sons remained in Acadia. Like his father, Thomas Cormier became a skilled carpenter. According to the Canadian and U.S. National Archives, Thomas is the ultimate ancestor of the Cormiers in the New World. Robert Cormier died on February 12, 1712. [date of birth/death unclear: 1602-1712? age: 110?] Sources are not agreed as to whether he was residing in France at the time of his death.

Cormier stands typical of most emigrants in that he was an indentured servant who earned his passage, he brought his family over to the New World (unlike, e.g., many early settlers of Virginia or Mexico), and - typically Acadian - enjoyed a longer lifespan than his Old World peasant counterpart.
