= National Geophysical Data Center =

Former data center of the U.S. NOAA

Agency overview
- Formed: 1965
- Preceding agency: Central Radio Propagation Laboratory
- Dissolved: 2015
- Superseding agency: National Centers for Environmental Information
- Status: merged
- Headquarters: Boulder, Colorado
- Employees: 50
- Parent department: National Environmental Satellite, Data, and Information Service
- Website: www.ngdc.noaa.gov

The United States National Geophysical Data Center (NGDC) provided scientific stewardship, products and services for geophysical data describing the solid earth, marine, and solar-terrestrial environment, as well as earth observations from space. It was established in 1965 as part of the new Environmental Science Services Administration until that organization became the National Oceanic & Atmospheric Administration (NOAA) in 1970. In 2015, NGDC was merged with the National Climatic Data Center (NCDC) and the National Oceanographic Data Center (NODC) into the National Centers for Environmental Information (NCEI).

== Location and controlling bodies ==
Since 1972 the NGDC was located in Boulder, Colorado, as a part of the US Department of Commerce (USDOC), National Oceanic & Atmospheric Administration (NOAA), National Environmental Satellite, Data and Information Service (NESDIS).

== Data holdings ==
NGDC's data holdings contained more than 300 digital and analog databases, with over 37 terabytes of unique digital records plus paper, film, slides and microfilm in 2003. As technology advanced, so did the search for more efficient ways of preserving these data. This data is now maintained by the NCEI.

== Data contributors ==
NGDC worked closely with contributors of scientific data to prepare documented, reliable data sets. They welcomed cooperative projects with other government agencies, nonprofit organizations, and universities, and encourage data exchange.

== Data users ==
NGDC's data users included:

- private industry
- universities and other educational facilities
- research organizations
- federal, state, and local governments
- foreign governments, industry, and academia
- publishers and other mass media
- the general public

== Data management ==
The Data Center developed data management programs that reflect the changing world of geophysics. These programs are now part of the National Centers for Environmental Information.
