= International Union of Geodesy and Geophysics =

International non-governmental organization

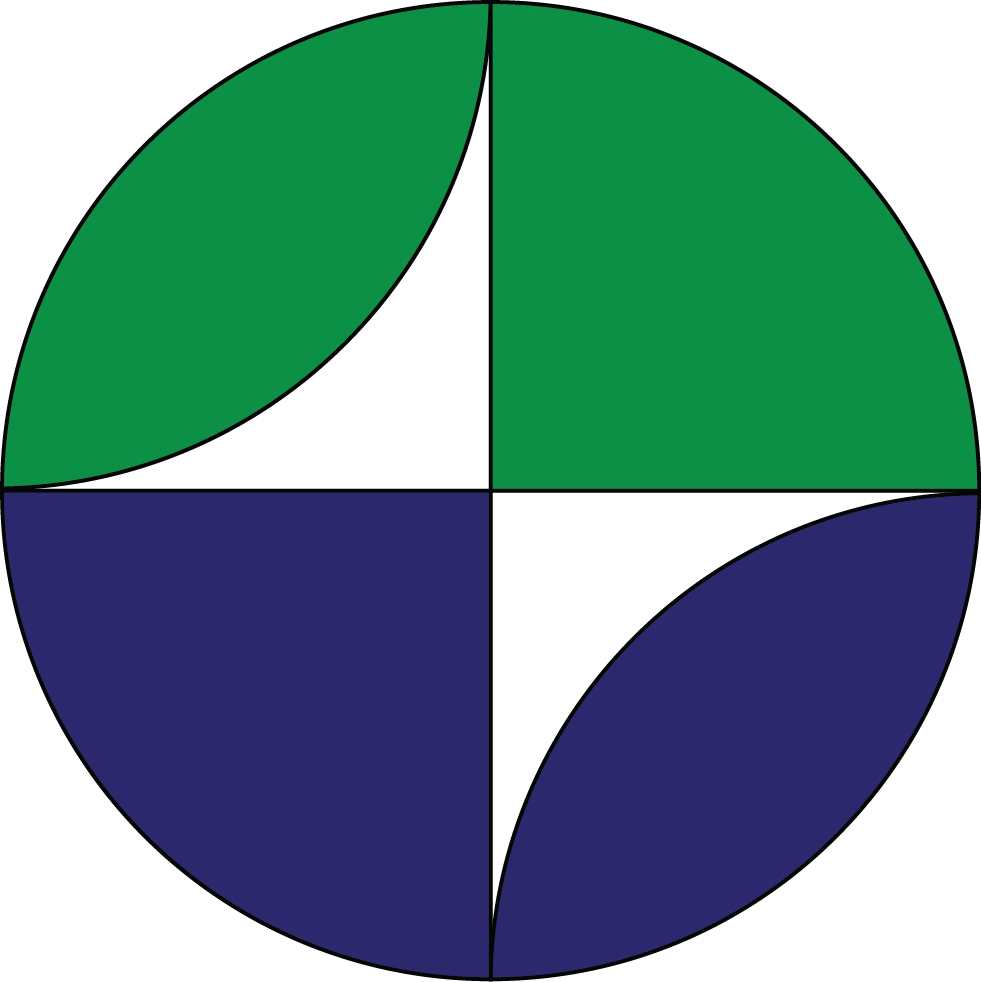
- Abbreviation: IUGG
- Formation: 1919; 107 years ago
- Type: INGO
- Location: Potsdam, Germany
- Region served: Worldwide
- Official language: English, French
- President: Chris Rizos (Australia)
- Secretary General: Alexander Rudloff (Germany)
- Treasurer: Niels Andersen (Denmark)
- Executive Secretary: Franz Kuglitsch (Germany)
- Website: www.iugg.org

The International Union of Geodesy and Geophysics (IUGG; French: Union géodésique et géophysique internationale, UGGI) is an international non-governmental organization dedicated to the scientific study of Earth and its space environment using geophysical and geodetic techniques. The IUGG is a member of the International Science Council (ISC), which is composed of international scholarly and scientific institutions and national academies of sciences.

== History ==
The IUGG was established in Brussels, Belgium in 1919.

== Objectives ==
IUGG's objectives are the promotion and coordination of studies related to Earth's physical, chemical and mathematical representation. This includes geometrical shape, internal structure, gravity and magnetic fields, seismicity, volcanism, hydrologic cycle, glaciers, oceans, atmosphere, ionosphere, and magnetosphere of Earth. It also includes solar, lunar and planetary studies. Some areas within its scope are environmental preservation, reduction of the effects of natural hazards, and mineral resources.

== Structures ==
The IUGG consists of eight semi-autonomous associations:

- International Association of Cryospheric Sciences (IACS)
- International Association of Geodesy (IAG)
- International Association of Geomagnetism and Aeronomy (IAGA)
- International Association of Hydrological Sciences (IAHS)
- International Association of Meteorology and Atmospheric Sciences (IAMAS)
- International Association for the Physical Sciences of the Oceans (IAPSO)
- International Association of Seismology and Physics of the Earth's Interior (IASPEI)
- International Association of Volcanology and Chemistry of the Earth's Interior (IAVCEI)

It has also established six commissions to promote interdisciplinary problems:

- Climatic and Environmental Changes (CCEC)
- Mathematical Geophysics (CMG)
- Geophysical Risk and Sustainability (GRC)
- Study of the Earth's Deep Interior (SEDI)
- Data and Information (UCDI)
- Planetary Sciences (UCPS)

and the Union Working Group on History.

== General Assemblies, Presidents, and Secretaries General ==
List of General Assemblies, Presidents, and Secretaries-General.

Nr.	Year	General Assembly in		President			Secretary-General		
28.	2023	Berlin	Germany	2023-2027	Chris Rizos	Australia			
27.	2019	Montreal	Canada	2019-2023	Kathryn Whaler	United Kingdom	2019-2023	Alexander Rudloff	Germany
26.	2015	Prague	Czech Republic	2015-2019	Michael Sideris	Canada	2015-2019	Alik Ismail-Zadeh	Germany / Russia
25.	2011	Melbourne	Australia	2011-2015	Harsh Gupta	India	2011-2015	Alik Ismail-Zadeh	Germany / Russia
24.	2007	Perugia	Italy	2007-2011	Tom Beer	Australia	2007-2011	Alik Ismail-Zadeh	Germany / Russia
23.	2003	Sapporo	Japan	2003-2007	Uri Shamir	Israel	2003-2007	JoAnn Joselyn	United States
22.	1999	Birmingham	United Kingdom	1999-2003	Masaru Kono	Japan	1999-2003	JoAnn Joselyn	United States
21.	1995	Boulder	United States	1995-1999	P.J. Wyllie	United States	1995-1999	Georges Balmino	France
20.	1991	Vienna	Austria	1991-1995	Helmut Moritz	Austria	1991-1995	Georges Balmino	France
19.	1987	Vancouver	Canada	1987-1991	V.I. Keilis-Borok	Soviet Union	1987-1991	Baron Paul Melchior	Belgium
18.	1983	Hamburg	West Germany	1983-1987	D. Lal	India	1983-1987	Baron Paul Melchior	Belgium
17.	1979	Canberra	Australia	1979-1983	G.D. Garland	Canada	1979-1983	Baron Paul Melchior	Belgium
16.	1975	Grenoble	France	1975-1979	A. Ashour	Egypt	1973-1979	Baron Paul Melchior	Belgium
15.	1971	Moscow	Soviet Union	1971-1975	H. Charnock	United Kingdom	1973-1991	Baron Paul Melchior	Belgium
14.	1967	Zurich	Switzerland	1967-1971	J. Coulomb	France	1967-1973	G.D. Garland	Canada
13.	1963	Berkeley	United States	1963-1967	J. Kaplan	United States	1963-1967	G.D. Garland	Canada
12.	1960	Helsinki	Finland	1960-1963	V.V. Beloussov	Soviet Union	1960-1963	G.R. Laclavère	France
11.	1957	Toronto	Canada	1957-1960	J.T. Wilson	Canada	1957-1960	G.R. Laclavère	France
10.	1954	Rome	Italy	1954-1957	K.R. Ramanathan	India	1954-1957	G.R. Laclavère	France
9.	1951	Brussels	Belgium	1951-1954	S. Chapman	United Kingdom	1951-1954	G.R. Laclavère	France
8.	1948	Oslo	Norway	1948-1951	F.A. Vening Meinesz	Netherlands	1946-1951	J.M. Stagg	United Kingdom
7.	1939	Washington DC	United States	1946-1948	B. Helland-Hansen	Norway	1939-1946	H. St. J.L. Winterbotham	United Kingdom
6.	1936	Edinburgh	United Kingdom	1936-1942	D. La Cour	Denmark	1936-1939	H. St. J.L. Winterbotham	United Kingdom
5.	1933	Lisbon	Portugal	1933-1936	W. Bowie	United States	1933-1936	H. St. J.L. Winterbotham	United Kingdom
4.	1930	Stockholm	Sweden	1919-1933	C. Lallemand	France	1930-1933	H. St. J.L. Winterbotham	United Kingdom
3.	1927	Prague	Czechoslovakia	1919-1933	C. Lallemand	France	1927-1930	Sir Henry Lyons	United Kingdom
2.	1924	Madrid	Spain	1919-1933	C. Lallemand	France	1924-1927	Sir Henry Lyons	United Kingdom
1.	1922	Rome	Italy	1919-1933	C. Lallemand	France	1919-1924	Sir Henry Lyons	United Kingdom

== See also ==
- List of geoscience organizations
