= Cooperative Institute for Research in Environmental Sciences =

Research institute

- Formation: 1967
- Type: Research institute
- Location: United States

The Cooperative Institute for Research in Environmental Sciences (CIRES) is a research institute that is sponsored jointly by the National Oceanic and Atmospheric Administration (NOAA) Office of Oceanic and Atmospheric Research (OAR) and the University of Colorado Boulder (CU). CIRES scientists study the Earth system, including the atmosphere, hydrosphere, cryosphere, biosphere, and geosphere, and communicate these findings to decision makers, the scientific community, and the public.

It is one of 16 NOAA Cooperative Institutes (CIs).

== History and research ==
CIRES was established in 1967 and is the oldest and largest of NOAA's cooperative institutes nationwide. CIRES facilitates interdisciplinary collaboration between researchers at the University of Colorado and NOAA's Office of Oceanic and Atmospheric Research (OAR), National Environmental Satellite, Data and Information Service (NESDIS), and the National Weather Service (NWS).

CIRES includes more than 800 scientists, staff, and students, and CIRES scientists publish more than 500 peer reviewed publications annually. Examples of research focused upon societal needs include monitoring changes in the atmospheric concentration of greenhouse gases, assessing the health of Earth's ozone layer, projecting the impacts of climate change on water supply and other critical resources, documenting the thinning of polar ice, monitoring the quality of the air and water, helping to respond to drought and wildfire, developing microbial agents for degrading environmental pollutants, improving earthquake predictions, and providing decision makers with information for more effective risk assessments.

The current director of CIRES is the former NASA Chief Scientist, Waleed Abdalati.

== Divisions ==
Cryospheric and Polar Processes Division (CPP) The cryosphere comprises Arctic climate, ice sheets and glaciers, snow cover and snow hydrology, and permafrost. Cryospheric and Polar Processes Division research at CIRES combines data collection, modeling, and data analysis to understand how the cryosphere influences, and responds to, changes in the global climate.

Another major activity of this division is archiving and distributing satellite information about the cryosphere in the Snow and Ice Distributed Active Archive Center (DAAC) as a part of NASA's Earth Observing System (EOS) Data and Information Center. These data increase scientists’ understanding of how the cryosphere is changing and the global impacts of those changes.

Ecosystem Science Division (ES) This division research focuses on water quality, land-atmosphere exchanges, and regional and global disturbances. Research focuses on topics such as bacteria that break down environmental toxins; land use changes; nutrient and pollutant studies in lakes and streams; biogenic emissions of important trace gases to the atmosphere; and protection of crops against frost.

Environmental Chemistry Division (EC) Research topics include measurements and analysis of pollutants and naturally occurring compounds, reaction kinetics, surface science, and analytical instrumentation development. Recent studies cover wide-ranging subjects including acid rain, air and water pollution like that occurring in the Denver brown cloud, and climate change resulting from emission of carbon dioxide and other pollutants. Other areas of research include stratospheric ozone depletion, tropospheric photochemical oxidant formation, and the increase of atmospheric greenhouse gases.

Environmental Observations, Modeling and Forecasting Division (EOMF) This division focuses on increasing understanding of interactive processes in the Earth's physical environment and developing a clearer picture of its sensitivities to natural and human-caused change. One chief area of study is the greenhouse effect and how to determine the onset of a theoretically predicted warming.

Solid Earth Sciences Division (SES) Active research areas in geophysics include earthquake prediction; studies of the size, shape, and dynamic forces of Earth; isotope geochemistry; and the behavior of Earth's core and mantle. This research involves the use of seismography, analytical and numerical modeling efforts, and space geodetic techniques, such as laser ranging, artificial satellites, and interferometric observations of radio waves emanating from deep space.

An important component of CIRES research in geodesy/geodynamics is participation in the multi-university consortium developed to assemble, test, and administer the deployment of instrument packages that use radio signals from Global Positioning System (GPS) satellites to determine distances between points on Earth's surface. The scientific objective is to monitor crustal deformation in tectonically active areas.

Weather and Climate Dynamics Division (WCD) This division focuses on understanding how global processes are intertwined to create the weather and climate observed from the troposphere to the mesosphere. This includes observational and theoretical research on the interactive boundary layers; the El Niño Southern Oscillation (ENSO) and its effects on climate prediction; global waves and turbulence in the stratosphere; and fine-scale turbulence in the boundary layer.

== Centers and programs ==
CIRES supports four centers that provide the functional link between NOAA and 11 departments at the University of Colorado Boulder. The centers include the:

- Center for Limnology, studying lakes, streams, and wetlands;
- Center for Science and Technology Policy Research (CSTPR), which conducts research and education to meet the needs of public and private decision makers for environmental science information;
- Earth Science and Observation Center (ESOC), focusing on the development and application of remote sensing techniques for studying all aspects of the Earth system;
- National Snow and Ice Data Center (NSIDC), which studies Earth's frozen realms (called the cryosphere), including floating sea ice, lake ice, glaciers, ice sheets, snow cover, and permafrost.

CIRES also has two interdisciplinary programs: Western Water Assessment (WWA) and Education and Outreach. WWA is one of 11 NOAA-funded Regional Integrated Sciences and Assessments (RISA) programs across the country. WWA researchers, specializing in climate, water, ecology, law, and the social sciences, work with decision makers across the West to produce useful, policy-relevant information about climate variability and change.
