= Adelman =

Adelman or Adelmann is a given name and surname of Germanic origin, and means "nobleman", being a combination of "adel" (nobility) and "mann" (man). The name may refer to:

== People ==
=== Given name ===
- Adelmann (archbishop of Milan) (died 956)
- Adelmann of Liège (died 1061), Italian bishop

=== Surname ===
- Bob Adelman (1930–2016), American photographer
- David E. Adelman, American lawyer and academic
- David I. Adelman (born 1964), American diplomat and lawyer
- David J. Adelman (born 1972), American businessman and philanthropist
- Georg von Adelmann (1811–1888), German physician
- Howard Adelman (1938–2023), Canadian philosopher
- Irma Adelman (1930–2017), American economist
- Janet Adelman (1941–2010), American scholar
- Jeremy Adelman (born 1960), American historian
- Jeremy Adelman (composer) (born 1973), American musician
- Kenneth Adelman (born 1946), American diplomat and writer
- Lynn Adelman (born 1939), American judge
- Martyn Adelman (born 1947), British photographer and drummer
- Paul Adelman, British historian
- Raban Adelmann (1912–1992), German politician
- Rick Adelman (born 1946), American basketball player and coach
- Saul Adelman (born 1944), American astronomer
- Skippy Adelman (1924–2004), jazz photographer
- Uri Adelman (1958–2004), Israeli writer and musician
- Warren Adelman (born 1963), American businessman

== See also ==
- Addelman
- Adleman
- Edelman
- Edelmann
