= David Crews =

American zoologist

- Born: David Pafford Crews; Jacksonville, Florida, U.S.
- Education: The University of Maryland, Rutgers University
- Known for: Animal behavior, reproductive behavior, sexual differentiation, neuroendocrinology and translational epigenetics
- Scientific career
- Fields: Psychology, zoology, animal behavior
- Workplaces: The University of Texas at Austin
- Doctoral advisor: Daniel S. Lehrman, Jay S. Rosenblatt

David Pafford Crews is the Ashbel Smith Professor of Zoology and Psychology at the University of Texas at Austin. He has been a pioneer in several areas of reproductive biology, including evolution of sexual behavior and differentiation, neural and phenotypic plasticity, and the role of endocrine disruptors on brain and behavior.

== Biography ==
Crews enrolled at the Munich campus of the University of Maryland in 1965, then transferred to the College Park campus in 1967. He graduated with a B.A. (Psychology and Sociology majors) in 1969. Following a summer as a research assistant at Walter Reed Army Institute of Research in the Department of Experimental Psychology he decided to pursue a degree in psychology. Crews received a Ph.D. in Psychobiology as a National Institute of Mental Health Predoctoral Trainee at the Institute of Animal Behavior at Rutgers University in 1973 under the mentorship of Daniel S. Lehrman and Jay S. Rosenblatt.

He completed a National Science Foundation Postdoctoral Fellowship mentored by Paul Licht at the Department of Integrative Biology at the University of California, Berkeley until 1975. He was then appointed as a lecturer in the Departments of Biology and Psychology at Harvard University. He was promoted to assistant professor in 1976 and to associate professor in 1979. While at Harvard he was also an associate at the Museum of Comparative Zoology. In 1982, he joined the faculty of the Department of Zoology (now Integrative Biology) at the University of Texas at Austin, where he became the Ashbel Smith Professor of Zoology and Psychology in 1998.

== Research ==
=== Origin of sexual behavior ===
Crews has argued that the primary function of sexual behavior, namely the stimulation and coordination of the reproductive physiologies of the interacting individuals (usually male and female), originated with the first unicellular organisms and hence predates the evolution of sexual recombination. He has challenged the Organizational/Default doctrine of sex determination, extending it to sexual differentiation of the brain and arguing for its replacement with an Ancestral (female)/Derived (male) paradigm. This concept has led to questions such as why might males be more like females than females are like males? The utility of this concept is becoming apparent as we continue to gather evidence for gender differences in genetic and mental disorders. He also has been a major player in the area of the evolution and diversity of steroid hormone receptors.

==== Red-sided Garter ====
Crews discovered the important principle that sexual behavior, gamete production, and steroid hormone secretion could be dissociated, in his studies of the red-sided garter snake (T. s. parietalis). These snakes are the northernmost reptile and hibernate for much of the year, responding to temperature both to emerge from winter dormancy and to engage in sexual behavior. It was his work with this species that provided the first demonstration that the activation of sexual behavior could be independent of sex steroid hormones, depending instead upon increasing spring temperature. This work also led to the first isolation, identification and synthesis of a new class of pheromones.

==== Whiptail Lizard ====
The desert grassland whiptail lizard (A. uniparens), presented an opportunity to study first-hand how the neuroendocrine substrates underlying sexual behavior can evolve. In this instance, Crews used a parthenogenetic species derived from interbreeding of two sexual species. Remarkably, although the descendant species consists only of females, reproducing by obligate parthenogenesis, individuals continue to display sexual behaviors that are typical of both females and males, alternating behaviors depending upon their individual hormone profiles across reproductive cycles. Although it is not immediately apparent what benefit could come of females engaging in male-typical behaviors in a parthenogenetic species, Crews has shown that this behavior is important to stimulate reproduction of both individuals in these pairings.

By comparing the unisexual descendants with their sexual ancestors, Crews revealed how hormone-brain controlling mechanisms evolve. This work led to the examination of how novel hormone-brain controlling mechanisms might respond to new challenges. Of particular note is the revelation that the male-typical sexual behaviors which parthenogenetic females display turn out to be under the control of the postovulatory surge of progesterone rather than androgen, which the parthenogens do not produce. This discovery in the parthenogenetic lizard led Crews to extend his work to genetically modified mice and rats, demonstrating that progesterone is not a “female-specific” hormone but plays a critical role in sexual behavior in males. Indeed, Crews demonstrated that androgen and progesterone synergize in males to control copulatory behavior much as estrogen and progesterone synergize in females to facilitate sexual receptivity. These discoveries have shed light on recent work in humans suggesting a clinical significance of progesterone in male sexual behavior.

==== Temperature-dependent sex determination ====
Crews has been the leader in determining the physiological and molecular bases of temperature-dependent sex determination (TSD). Sex determination is a case study in how evolution has produced different mechanisms for achieving the same end. In many reptiles the sex of the offspring depends on the incubation temperature of the egg, not on genotype as in mammals. One question concerns how the physical stimulus of temperature is transduced into a molecular and physiological stimulus to determine an individual's gonadal sex. Crews demonstrated that incubation temperature acts on a group of genes homologous to those in mammals that affect gonadal differentiation. This work helped overturn the classic tenet that males are the “organized” sex and females the “default” sex. Today we recognize both sexes as organized and the question now becomes how the activation of a conserved network of genes leads to a binary response (ovary or testis).

==== Leopard Gecko ====
He is a pioneer in the relatively new field (actually rebirth) of phenotypic plasticity, or the process by which the environment induces different phenotypes from a given genotype. When considering that species without sex chromosomes possess all of the genes necessary to develop the phenotype of both sexes, it becomes apparent that the process of sex determination and sexual differentiation represents a form of phenotypic plasticity. Using the leopard gecko (E. macularius) as the animal model system, Crews determined how the experience of temperature during a narrowly defined period of embryogenesis affects the total phenotype of the adult organism, accounting for much of the variation observed among individuals in morphology, growth, endocrinology, neural activity, and neuroanatomy. Some sociosexual behaviors and brain measures are affected directly by incubation temperature, whereas both incubation temperature as well as gonadal sex influences others.

=== Epigenetics ===
Crews was the first to demonstrate that behavioral differences among genetically modified mice may be exaggerated or blurred by the postnatal environment. For example, mice develop in litters of varying sex ratios and genotypes, and it is possible that some of the diagnostic behavioral characteristics may result from an interaction of the sex ratio and genotype ratio of the litter. By varying sex ratios and genotypes, he was able to show that the diagnostic behavioral characteristics and their underlying neural activity result from an interaction of sex and genotype ratio of the litter. This type of work calls attention to the need for researchers using genetically modified animal models to consider the context in which the phenotypes emerge.

==== Transgenerational epigenetics ====
Crews discovered that the transgenerational epigenetic modification caused by vinclozolin exposure changes the way rats three generations removed (F3) from the original exposure perceive and react to conspecifics. This was the first demonstration that endocrine disrupting chemicals (EDCs) can promote a transgenerational alteration in the epigenome that influences sexual selection, and possibly affect the viability of a population and evolution of the species. This work was recognized by the University Cooperative Society with the 2008 Research Excellence Award for Best Research Paper, University of Texas at Austin, and was listed as one of the "Top 100 Science Stories of 2007" by Discover Magazine. Crews then extended his work into the realm of social, learning, and anxiety-related behaviors as well as the functional activity of the brain mechanisms that underlie them. His most recent work demonstrated that ancestral exposure to EDCs alters how descendants perceive and react to life challenges, in this case stress experienced during adolescence. Specifically, he established that environmentally induced epigenetic transgenerational inheritance alters brain development and genome activity to modify stress-induced behavioral responses exhibited by F3 males. This latest work has been hailed as "important paper and a paradigm shift in our understanding of the interaction between epigenetic change and behaviors."

Crews also explored the theoretical aspects of environmental epigenetics, making the important distinction between the nature of epigenetic modifications. Context-dependent epigenetic change occurs as a consequence of exposure. A defining element is that this type of change requires continued exposure to the environmental insult. For example, environmental factors that bring about an epigenetic modification may simply continue to persist. Should the diet, behavior, or a toxic environmental exposure continues across generations, the epigenetic modification will manifest in each generation. Such environmentally induced epigenetic state(s) can be reversed by removal or alteration of the factor, addition of a different environmental factor, or emigration from the contaminated site. Another form of epigenetic modification may occur when the change in the epigenome is incorporated into the germline, a process Crews has termed germline-dependent epigenetic change. In this type, the effect manifests in each generation even in the absence of the causative agent. Context-dependent epigenetic modification is fundamentally different from germline-dependent epigenetic modification. Although both have been attributed with “transgenerational” properties, only in the latter (germline) instance will the trait be passed to the next generation even in the absence of any continued exposures or stimuli. Taken together this work has generated a new perspective on the old question of ‘inherited vs experienced, ancestral vs acquired, or nature vs nurture’ and promises to shed new light on health management strategy.

=== Environmental issues ===
With Andrea Gore of the University of Texas at Austin, College of Pharmacy, Crews has explored the reality of living in a contaminated world. They showed that the links between nature and nurture need to be redefined to accommodate anthropogenic chemical contamination. In recognizing and accepting this worldwide change, the types of adaptations that have occurred as a consequence must be considered. In addition, they proposed a fundamental shift in the field that integrates various disciplines involved in the study of environmental contamination to recognize that contamination is widespread and cannot be remedied at the global level. Thus, greater effort must be placed on integrative and interdisciplinary studies that explicitly illuminate how the causal mechanisms and functional outcomes of related processes operate at each level of biological organization while at the same time revealing the relations among the levels. This article caused a good deal of comment, and with analysis now extending to the problem of evolution in a contaminated world. Here they discuss how epigenetic outcomes at the level of both the individual organism and the evolution of the population has created ‘new species’.

Crews founded Reptile Conservation International in 1992 based on his discovery that application of estrogen to turtle and gecko eggs skews the sex distribution toward females. They have been able to use this discovery to increase numbers of breeding females for three species of threatened reptile.

=== Educational impact ===
Crews has had a significant impact on science and our understanding of nature. Introductory textbooks in biology, psychology, ecology, evolution, and neuroscience use his work to illustrate various principles; indeed his work has penetrated to the high school textbook level. His work is also frequently seen in film and television programs and has been featured in several articles and texts in the philosophy of science (e.g., Writing Biology by Greg Myers). Lastly, he has played a major role in the mentoring of undergraduates in research, many of whom have gone on to research in medicine and various academic careers. This mainly has been via a vehicle of his own making, the Undergraduate Biomedical Training Program, initiated while he was at Harvard University and continued to this day at the University of Texas at Austin. This program has graduated over 54 students, many of whom are active researchers today, and produced more than 80 original papers with the students as authors, in many cases as first author.

== Honors and awards ==
- Daniel S. Lehrman Lifetime Achievement Award, Society for Behavioral Neuroendocrinology (2012)
- University Cooperative Society's 2008 Research Excellence Award for Best Research Paper, University of Texas at Austin (2008)
- Fellow, American Psychological Association, Division 6 (2001)
- Fellow, The American Academy of Arts and Sciences (1996)
- Fellow, American Psychological Society (1991)
- American Psychological Association Distinguished Scientific Award for an Early Career Contribution to Psychology (1979)
- NIMH MERIT Award (1989)
- NIMH Research Scientist Award (1987-1998)
- NIMH Research Scientist Development Award (1977-1987)
- Howard A. Bern Distinguished Lecture in Comparative Endocrinology, Division of Comparative Endocrinology, Society for Integrative and Comparative Biology (2017)
- D. O. Hebb Distinguished Scientific Contribution Award, Division 6 (the Society for Behavioral Neuroscience and Comparative Psychology), American Psychological Association (2016)
- George C. Wheeler Distinguished Lecture, University of North Dakota (2015)
- Elsevier Keynote Speaker, Society for Behavioral Neuroendocrinology
- Center for the Integrative Study of Animal Behavior Exemplar Award (2015)
- Charles H. Sawyer Distinguished Lecture, UCLA (2014)

== Selected publications ==
Crews has published over 400 papers, with 5 papers in Nature, 9 papers in Science, 8 papers in the Proceedings of the National Academy of Sciences of the United States of America, and 4 papers in Scientific American; and edited 4 books.

- Crews, David (1979). "The hormonal control of behavior in a lizard". Scientific American. 241 (2): 180–187. Bibcode:1979SciAm.241b.180C. doi:10.1038/scientificamerican0879-180. PMID 493916.
- Crews, David; Garstka, William R. (1982). "The ecological physiology of a garter snake". Scientific American. 247 (5): 158–168. Bibcode:1982SciAm.247e.158C. doi:10.1038/scientificamerican1182-158.
- Crews, David (1987). "Courtship in unisexual lizards: A model for brain evolution". Scientific American. 257 (6): 116–121. Bibcode:1987SciAm.257f.116C. doi:10.1038/scientificamerican1287-116.
- Crews, David; Moore, Michael C. (1986). "Evolution of mechanisms controlling mating behavior". Science. 231 (4734): 121–125. Bibcode:1986Sci...231..121C. doi:10.1126/science.3941893. PMID 3941893.
- Crews, David (1994). "Animal sexuality". Scientific American. 270 (1): 108–114. Bibcode:1994SciAm.270a.108C. doi:10.1038/scientificamerican0194-108. PMID 8284656.
- Crews, David; Gore, Andrea C. (2011). "Life Imprints: Living in a Contaminated World". Environmental Health Perspectives. 119 (9): 1208–1210. doi:10.1289/ehp.1103451. PMC 3230404. PMID 21571618.
- Crews, David; Gore, Andrea C. (2012). "Epigenetic synthesis: a need for a new paradigm for evolution in a contaminated world". F1000 Biology Reports. 4: 18. doi:10.3410/B4-18. PMC 3434969. PMID 22991583.
