= Thane Wibbels =

American zoologist

- Education: B.S. in Zoology, University of Nebraska–Lincoln, 1978 M.S. in Marine Sciences, University of Houston, 1981 Ph.D. in Zoology, Texas A&M, 1987
- Occupations: Professor, Department of Biology, UAB
- Spouse: Kathleen Rich (married 1978-present)

Thane Wibbels is a professor at the University of Alabama at Birmingham (UAB) who specializes in zoology, physiology, evolution, and ecology. His research ventures focus on sea turtle endocrinology and conservation, centering around marine sea turtles with an emphasis on temperature-dependent sex determination.

== Early life and education ==
Wibbels was born and raised in Columbus, Nebraska. During his formative years, due to family travel and exposure to televised science programs such as the National Geographic and Jacques Cousteaus, Wibbels acquired a broad interest in biology. After graduating high school, Wibbels attended the University of Nebraska–Lincoln (UNL) and graduated with his B.S. in Zoology in 1978. It was during his time at UNL that Wibbels developed an interest in the marine sciences. After graduating from UNL, Wibbels got accepted to the marine science master's program at the University of Houston (UH) and graduated with his M.S. in Marine Sciences in 1981. During his time at UH, Wibbels worked with the National Marine Fisheries Services in Galveston, Texas, raising and researching Kemp's ridley sea turtles. After graduating with his Masters of Science, Wibbels sought further education and attended Texas A&M where he earned his Ph.D. in Zoology in 1987 under the guidance of Dr. David Owens for his contribution to sea turtle reproductive endocrinology.

== Career ==
Wibbels' science journey commenced with the conservation of Kemp's ridley sea turtles and later expanded to encompass research on reproductive physiology and temperature-dependent sex determination across various turtle species. He recounts his participation in vital conservation initiatives through a variety of collaborations and activities during his career. At the Galveston fisheries, he was involved in raising Kemp's ridley sea turtles and investigating their orientation and sea-finding behavior for his master's research. He joined forces with Dr. David Owens at Texas A&M to study turtle reproductive biology, focusing on reproductive biology of sea turtles, including the olive ridley sea turtles in Mexico, loggerhead sea turtles in Florida, and sea turtles on the Great Barrier Reef in Australia. As a postdoctoral researcher at the University of Texas at Austin (UT Austin) in the laboratories of Dr. David Crews and Dr. James J. Bull, Wibbels explored temperature-dependent sex determination in reptiles. Upon joining University of Alabama at Birmingham (UAB) in 1993, he initially continued his studies on the molecular biology of sex determination and expanded it to focus on the ecological, evolutionary, and conservational implications of temperature-dependent sex determination. His research at UAB has continued to focus on the conservation of the sea turtle, with an emphasis on the Kemp's ridley sea turtle.

=== Appointments ===
- 1988–1990: Postdoctoral Research Associate, Institute of Reproductive Biology, Department of Zoology, UT Austin
- 1990–1992: National Institute of Health (NIH) National Research Service Award Fellow, Institute of Reproductive Biology, Department of Zoology, UT Austin
- 1992: Lecturer, Department of Zoology, University of Texas at Austin (UT Austin)
- 1993–1999: Assistant Professor, Department of Biology, UAB
- 1999–2009: Associate Professor, Department of Biology, UAB
- 2009–present: Professor, Department of Biology, University of Alabama at Birmingham (UAB)

== Research ==
=== Kemp's ridley sea turtles ===
While completing his M.S. in Marine Sciences at the University of Houston, Wibbels worked on recovering the critically endangered Kemp's ridley sea turtle. He was a part of a "headstarting" project which was responsible for raising and releasing approximately 2,000 turtles each year. Wibbels contributed to research exploring effective conservation strategies of the Kemp's ridley and sea turtle behavior, ultimately writing his thesis on Kemp's ridley behavior and conservation.

Wibbels has been involved in public projects on the turtle. While at the University of Houston, Wibbels contributed to the production of a PBS documentary on Kemp's ridley sea turtles, called The Heartbreak Turtle. The documentary explored the near extinction of the Kemp's ridley sea turtle and conservation efforts implemented in the Gulf of Mexico by the U.S. and Mexico in the early 1980's. Additionally, in 2007 Wibbels was contracted by the NOAA and U.S. Fish and Wildlife Service to contribute to the 5-year review summary and evaluation on the conservation status of the Kemp's ridley sea turtle. Since 1998, Wibbels has continued to contribute to the conservation of the Kemp's ridley sea turtle through collaboration with the bi-national recovery program for the Kemp's ridley.

=== Sea turtle reproductive endocrinology and ecology ===
While pursuing his Ph.D. in Zoology at Texas A&M, Wibbels conducted research on multiple sea turtle species, including the olive ridley sea turtle, the loggerhead sea turtle, the hawksbill sea turtle, and the Kemp's ridley sea turtle. Wibbels sought to research sea turtles as a model for vertebrate zoology to better understand their physiology and life histories. While researching sea turtles under Dr. David Owens, a marine biology professor at Texas A&M, Wibbels traveled to Mexico to study the olive ridley sea turtle, and to Florida to study loggerhead sea turtles in collaboration with Dr. Llewellyn Ehrhart of the University of Central Florida. Wibbels then travelled with the Texas A&M research team to conduct research on Heron Island Atoll on the Great Barrier Reef in Australia after obtaining a grant from the National Science Foundation (NSF). Wibbels worked with renowned turtle researcher and conservationist Dr. Colin Limpus on studying the reproductive endocrinology and ecology of sea turtles. Their team captured approximately 900 sea turtles over the course of six months, capturing, tagging, and collecting blood samples on juvenile to adult sea turtles. During his time in Australia, Wibbels contributed to a PBS documentary released in 1987 titled Whence Turtles Come, which reported on the biology and conservation of sea turtles. Wibbels contributed to research exploring adult sea turtle reproductive endocrinology as a Ph.D. student.

=== Temperature-dependent sex determination (TSD) ===
Since obtaining his doctorate, Wibbels has primarily been conducting research on the physiology, ecology, and evolution of temperature-dependent sex determination (TSD) in reptiles and its implications for the conservation of endangered species. As a post-doctorate, Wibbels worked with Dr. David Crews and Dr. James J. Bull to help establish the red-eared slider turtle as a model organism for TSD. Since then, Wibbels has worked at UAB researching TSD in the red-eared slider as well as other reptile species, namely sea turtles species, and understanding the relationship between TSD, conservation, and climate change.

== Awards and honors ==
- 2020–2022: President of the Southeast Regional Sea Turtle Network
- 2019–2020: Vice President of the Southeast Regional Sea Turtle Network
- 2016: Lifetime Achievement Award, Southeast Regional Sea Turtle Symposium
- 2005–2008: Member of the Board of Directors, International Sea Turtle Society
- 2004–2005: President of the International Sea Turtle Society

== Select publications ==
- Bevan E., Wibbels T., Najera B.M.Z., Sarti L., Martinez F.I., Cuevas J.M., Gallaway B.J., Pena L.J., Burchfield P.M. 2016. Estimating the historic size and current status of the Kemp's ridley sea turtle ( Lepidochelys kempii ) population Ecosphere. 7. DOI: 10.1002/Ecs2.1244
- Wibbels, T. and E. Bevan. 2019. “IUCN Red List” World-Wide Assessment of the Conservation Status of the Kemp’s Ridley Sea Turtle (Lepidochelys kempii). (2019 IUCN, Morges, Switzerland).
- Wibbels, T., Roberge, T., and Place, A. (2018). Temperature-Dependent Sex Determination in the Diamond-Backed Terrapin (Malaclemys terrapin). In: Biology of the Diamond-Backed Terrapin (W. Roosenburg and V. Kennedy, eds). Johns Hopkins University Press. pp 127–145.
- Brieser, K., Wibbels, T. 2014. Chronology, Magnitude and Duration of Expression of Putative Sex-Determining/Differentiation Genes in a Turtle with Temperature-Dependent Sex Determination. Sexual Development, 8 (6): 364–375.
- Tapilatu, R.F., Dutton, P.H., Tiwari, M., Wibbels, T., Ferdinandus, H.V., Iwanggin, W.G., (2013). Long-term decline of the western Pacific leatherback, Dermochelys coriacea: a globally important sea turtle species. Ecosphere 4:1–15.
- LeBlanc, A.M, Wibbels, T., Shaver, D., Walker, S. (2012) The effects of temperature on the sex determination in the Kemp’s ridley. Endangered Species Research 19:123–128.
- Wibbels, T. (2008) Sex Determination and Sex Ratio in Ridley Sea Turtles. In: Biology and Conservation of Ridley Sea Turtles. P. Plotkin (ed) Johns Hopkins University Press. pp 167–189.
- Wibbels T. (2003) Critical approaches to sex determination in sea turtle biology and conservation. In: Biology of Sea Turtles, Volume 2. P. Lutz, J. Musik, J. Wynekan (eds), CRC Press. pp 103–134.
