= Alison Fleming (neuroscientist) =

Canadian neuroscientist

- Born: Canada
- Education: Columbia University (B.Sc.), Rutgers University (Ph.D.)
- Known for: Maternal behavior research, fMRI studies on postpartum depression
- Awards: Royal Society of Canada (2004); D.G. Marquis Behavioral Neuroscience Award (2004); University of Toronto Faculty Research Excellence Award (2005); Canada Research Chair in Behavioral Neurobiology (2005); Distinguished Professor of Psychology (2012); Daniel S. Lehrman Life-Time Achievement Award (2013)
- Scientific career
- Fields: Neuroscience, Psychology
- Workplaces: University of Toronto Mississauga, St. Joseph's Hospital
- Doctoral advisor: Jay S. Rosenblatt

Alison Fleming is a Canadian neuroscientist best known for her work studying mothering instincts and maternal behavior in a wide variety of models, including rats, mice, rabbits, monkeys, and humans. She is the University of Toronto Distinguished Professor of Psychology, 2012. She was previously a professor in the psychological and brain sciences department at the University of Toronto Mississauga.

== Academic career ==
Fleming received her B.Sc. from Columbia University in 1968. She earned her Ph.D. in 1972 from Rutgers University under the mentorship of Jay S. Rosenblatt. Her dissertation research surrounded the effect of external factors on maternal behavior in rats. Fleming also later published an account of Rosenblatt's contributions to the field of maternal behavior relationships, entitled "The three faces of Jay S. Rosenblatt."

Fleming's work at St. Joseph's Hospital has involved using functional magnetic resonance imaging (fMRI) to study postpartum depression. Fleming has also studied how teenage mothers respond to their infants. As of March 2020, she has published more than 170 journal articles.

== Awards and recognitions ==
- Elected member of the Royal Society of Canada, 2004
- D.G. Marquis Behavioral Neuroscience Award, 2004
- University of Toronto Faculty Research Excellence Award, 2005
- Canadian Research Chair in Behavioral Neurobiology, 2005
- University of Toronto Distinguished Professor of Psychology, 2012
- Daniel S. Lehrman Life-Time Achievement Award, 2013
