= Kenneth Walsh =

Kenneth Walsh may refer to:

- Kenneth A. Walsh (1916–1998), United States Marine Corps fighter ace in World War II
- Kenneth Andrew Walsh (born 1931), American/Canadian biochemist
- Ken Walsh (born 1945), American swimmer
- Kenneth T. Walsh, American journalist
- Kenneth Walsh (medical researcher), American medical researcher specializing in cardiovascular medicine
- Kenneth Walsh (politician), member of the Montana House of Representatives

== See also ==
- Kenneth Welsh (1942–2022), Canadian actor
