= Perceptive Advisors =

Healthcare investment firm in New York

Perceptive Advisors LLC
- Company type: Private
- Industry: Investment management
- Founded: July 1999; 26 years ago
- Founder: Joseph Edelman
- Headquarters: 51 Astor Place, New York City, New York, U.S.
- Key people: Joseph Edelman (CEO)
- Products: Hedge fund Venture capital Private equity Private credit
- AUM: US$8.5 billion (March 2025)
- Number of employees: 46 (March 2024)
- Website: www.perceptivelife.com

Perceptive Advisors ("Perceptive") is an American investment firm headquartered in New York City. It is focused on making public and private investments in the healthcare and biotechnology industries.

== Background ==
Perceptive Advisors was founded in July 1999 by Joseph Edelman. Edelman was previously a senior analyst at Aries Fund, a Paramount Capital Asset Management biotechnology hedge fund as well as a senior bBiotechnology analyst at Prudential Securities. His father was Isidore Edelman, a physician and researcher who became chair of the biochemistry and molecular biophysics department at Columbia University.

The firm's flagship fund is called the Perceptive Life Sciences Fund. The firm takes a high risk approach to investing as the biotech sector is considered very volatile and it take years to develop a drug that could be rejected by the Food and Drug Administration. The firm tends to focus on small and midcap companies and it may overpay for securities if it there is still growth potential or undersell securities if they have further downside potential. To help mitigate day-to-day volatility, it has set a maximum daily loss allowance of five percent on long and short positions.

In 2013, Perceptive launched its first credit fund, Perceptive Credit Opportunities Fund which raised $323 million. It would invest in vehicles such as direct secured loans, royalties and convertible structures for public and private companies.

In August 2018, Institutional Investor stated that Perceptive since inception only had two years of negative returns. It had lost 10.33% in 2002 and 23.98% in 2008.

In December 2019, Perceptive partnered with Xontogeny, a biotech startup accelerator to launch its first venture capital fund, Perceptive Xontogeny Venture Fund which raised $210 million. The fund would invest in biotech companies that were in preclinical development stage and help them move into the early clinical development stages. Prior to that Perceptive invested mainly in later-stage companies.

At the end of 2022, it was reported that Perceptive posted losses of more than 40% during the last two years. These were considered the worst losses in the firm's history.

== SEC SPAC fine ==
In September 2022, the U.S. Securities and Exchange Commission sued Perceptive for failing to disclose conflicts of interest related to special-purpose acquisition companies (SPACs). It claimed that in 2020, Perceptive advised its clients to invest in a series of SPACs without disclosing they were owned by both the firm's personnel and a private fund it had advised. Perceptive agreed to pay a $1.5 million fine to settle the case.
