= Regis Kelly =

Regis Kelly may refer to:

- Regis B. Kelly, Scottish neuroscientist and university administrator
- Regis "Pep" Kelly (1914–1990), Canadian ice hockey player

== See also ==
- Live! with Regis and Kelly, an American morning talk show
