= Victor E. Hall =

Canadian scientist

- Born: February 11, 1901; Victoria, British Columbia
- Died: July 23, 1981 (aged 80); Grand Forks, North Dakota
- Citizenship: Canada
- Education: Victoria Normal School; University of California, Berkeley; Stanford University
- Partner: Frances Gould Hall
- Scientific career
- Institutions: Stanford University; University of California, Los Angeles

Victor Ernest Hall (February 11, 1901 – July 23, 1981) was a Canadian scientist who researched physiology. His teaching and research career was spent at Stanford University and University of California, Los Angeles. He was executive editor of the Handbook of Physiology and long-time editor of the peer-reviewed journal the Annual Review of Physiology.

== Early life and education ==
Victor E. Hall was born on February 11, 1901, in Victoria, British Columbia to parents Ernest Amos Hall, a physician, and Mary Louisa Hall née Fox. He was afflicted by polio as a child; he relied on crutches to stand and walk. He attended the Victoria Normal School for one year and briefly attended University of California, Berkeley before transferring to Stanford University. He graduated from Stanford with his undergraduate degree in 1922, his master's degree in physiology in 1925, and his Doctor of Medicine in 1928.

== Career ==
After graduating with his Doctor of Medicine, Hall remained at Stanford to teach in the physiology department, becoming a full professor in 1941. He had research appointments at Harvard in 1936 and 1937, then at Cornell in 1937 and 1938. Though outside his research area, he had an interest in nuclear weapons. In 1945, he gave presentations to the public about the impact of the discovery of nuclear weapons and the possible civilian applications of nuclear technology. While at Stanford, one of his areas of research was the metabolic aspects of thermoregulation. He left Stanford in 1951 to teach at University of California, Los Angeles (UCLA). In 1964, he became the founding director of UCLA's Brain Information Service; he remained co-director after his retirement from UCLA in 1968, keeping the position until 1972.

When the Annual Review of Physiology was founded in 1938, creator J. Murray Luck asked Hall to be an associate editor. When Murray retired from the editor position in 1947, Hall succeeded him. For more than twenty years (1947–1971), Hall was the editor of the Annual Review of Physiology. He was also the executive editor of the Handbook of Physiology, published by the American Physiological Society.

== Personal life and death ==
He married Frances Marie Gould, one of his former students, in September 1940. They had several children. Hall died on July 23, 1981, in Grand Forks, North Dakota.
