= Rae Silver =

Canadian behavioral neuroendocrinologist

- Education: Rutgers University City College of New York McGill University
- Known for: Research on sleep-wake cycles and immune-nervous system interactions in the brain
- Scientific career
- Fields: Neuroscience and Neuroendocrinology
- Workplaces: Barnard College; Columbia University
- Doctoral advisor: Daniel S. Lehrman
- Website: http://www.columbia.edu/cu/psychology/silver/ https://psychology.barnard.edu/profiles/rae-silver

Rae Silver is a Canadian behavioral neuroendocrinologist and neuroscientist best known for her research on the role of the suprachiasmatic nucleus (SCN) of the hypothalamus in generating circadian rhythms, the role of mast cells in the brain, the physiological mechanisms of parental behavior in ring doves. Currently, she is the Helene L. and Mark N. Kaplan Professor of Natural & Physical Sciences as well as the Chair of the Neuroscience Program and Professor of Psychology at Barnard College. In addition, she is jointly appointed as a Professor in the Department of Psychology at Columbia University and in the Department of Pathology and Cell Biology with the Columbia College of Physicians and Surgeons.

== Education and career ==
Silver received her B.S. in Physiological Psychology from McGill University in 1966. She then received her M.A. in Biopsychology from City College of the City University of New York (CUNY) in 1970. She then received her Ph.D. in Biopsychology from the Institute of Animal Behavior at Rutgers University-Newark. Her doctoral advisor was Daniel S. Lehrman.

After receiving her graduate degree, Silver was an assistant professor at Rutgers University-Newark from 1972–1974. From 1974–76, she was an assistant professor at Hunter College of the City University of New York, as well as a research associate at The American Museum of Natural History. She then joined the faculty at Barnard College in 1976 and became a full professor in 1982. She has held her position as the Helene L. and Mark N. Kaplan Professor of Natural & Physical Sciences since 1990.

In 2002, she served as co‐Chair of the Research Maximization and Prioritization Committee at NASA, which prioritized biological research for the International Space Station. From 2006–2007, she served as a senior advisor to the Office of the Director at the National Science Foundation. She was also a representative of the U.S. on the Council of Scientists for the International Human Frontier Science Program, an international science funding body, where she served as Chair from 2010–2012.

From 2017–2019, Silver served as the president of the Society for Behavioral Neuroendocrinology.

In 2015, Silver was awarded the Daniel S. Lehrman Lifetime Achievement Award in Behavioral Neuroendocrinology, an award named in honor of her doctoral advisor.

Silver is currently a receiving editor for eNeuro, an open-access journal of the Society for Neuroscience, and is also a section editor for the European Journal of Neuroscience.

== Research ==
In her early research, Silver investigated the hormonal mechanisms of parental behavior in ring doves, which exhibit bi-parental care. Her early studies focused on the neural and hormonal mechanisms of behavior in male ring doves, in particular, as well as the sharing of parental responsibility and coordination between the male and female. She documented a number of changes in both members of the pair across the reproductive cycle, including in steroid hormones, luteinizing hormone, prolactin, vasoactive intestinal peptide (VIP), gonadotropin-releasing hormone (GnRH). Her interest in changes which occurred in the brains of ring doves during reproduction and parental behaviors, such as the timing of egg incubation bouts, led her to pursue questions related to circadian rhythms (daily cycles of activity and sleep). She and members of her lab then performed a number of fundamental experiments demonstrating on the mechanisms underlying circadian rhythms in both birds and mammals, including a series of experiments demonstrating that a hormonal signal from the SCN sustains circadian activity rhythms in golden hamsters. She has also conducted research on the role of mast cells, part of the immune system, on brain vasculature, hormone production, neuronal transmission, and behavior. Her current research areas focus on sleep-wake cycles and their neural bases, and on immune-nervous system interactions in the brain.

== Awards and recognition ==
- Society for Research on Biological Rhythms Directors Award for Mentoring, 2018
- Daniel S. Lerhman Lifetime Achievement Award in Behavioral Neuroendocrinology, 2015
- Fellow of the American Academy of Arts and Sciences, elected in 2003
- Fellow of the Association for the Advancement of Science (AAAS), elected in 1997

== Media Appearances ==
Silver appeared on The Daily Show with John Stewart in 1997 & 1999. She has spoken publicly about the challenges of being a woman in science, including as a TEDx speaker in 2015.

== Notable publications ==
- Silver, Rae (1978). "The Parental Behavior of Ring Doves: The intricately coordinated behavior of the male and female is based on distinct physiological mechanisms in the sexes". American Scientist. 66 (2): 209–215. JSTOR 27848517.
- Lehman, Michael N.; Silver, Rae; Gladstone, W. R.; Kahn, Robert M.; Gibson, Marie; Bittman, Eric L. (1 June 1987). "Circadian rhythmicity restored by neural transplant. Immunocytochemical characterization of the graft and its integration with the host brain". The Journal of Neuroscience. 7 (6): 1626–1638. doi:10.1523/JNEUROSCI.07-06-01626.1987. PMC 6568867. PMID 3598638. S2CID 15364778.
- Silver, Rae; LeSauter, Joseph; Tresco, Patrick A.; Lehman, Michael N. (August 1996). "A diffusible coupling signal from the transplanted suprachiasmatic nucleus controlling circadian locomotor rhythms". Nature. 382 (6594): 810–813. Bibcode:1996Natur.382..810S. doi:10.1038/382810a0. PMID 8752274. S2CID 4364531.
- Nautiyal, K. M.; Ribeiro, A. C.; Pfaff, D. W.; Silver, R. (11 November 2008). "Brain mast cells link the immune system to anxiety-like behavior". Proceedings of the National Academy of Sciences. 105 (46): 18053–18057. Bibcode:2008PNAS..10518053N. doi:10.1073/pnas.0809479105. PMC 2584714. PMID 19004805.
