= Iva Troj =

Bulgarian-Swedish artist (born 1969)

- Born: July 1, 1969 (age 57); Plovdiv, Bulgaria
- Citizenship: Bulgarian-Swedish
- Education: T.L. School of the Arts; California College of Arts and Crafts; University of Södertörn; University of Borås; Selinus University
- Known for: Painting, Drawing, Illustration
- Notable work: Halo Infinite Masterpiece (2021)
- Movement: Contemporary, Neo-Renaissance

Iva Troj (born 1 July 1969) is a Bulgarian-born Swedish contemporary painter, illustrator and author based in Brighton, United Kingdom. She is known for oil paintings that combine Renaissance techniques with postmodern imagery, and for creating a large-scale commissioned painting for the launch of the Xbox video game Halo Infinite in 2021. That work was exhibited at the Saatchi Gallery in London and at the Carrousel du Louvre in Paris.

== Early life and education ==
Troj grew up in Plovdiv, Bulgaria, during the final years of communist rule in Eastern Europe, and later studied art and design in the United States and Scandinavia. In 2013, she established an art practice in the UK. She holds a PhD in art history.

== Career ==
Troj established her art practice in the United Kingdom in 2013.

In late 2021, Troj was commissioned by Xbox UK and communications agency Edelman to create a large-scale oil painting to mark the launch of Halo Infinite, the twentieth-anniversary instalment of the Halo franchise. The main painting was unveiled at Saatchi Gallery in London in December 2021. A second, smaller work commissioned by Xbox France was displayed concurrently at the Carrousel du Louvre in Paris.

In September 2022, Troj was invited to exhibit a body of paintings at The Louvre in Paris, presenting works including the large-format drawings Barefoot, Element, and Life-sized Ghosts, the latter two created specifically for the exhibition.

== Books ==
- Hello Troj (2022)
- Origami Wine

== Awards and recognition ==
- The Towry Best of East England Award in 2013
- The Contemporary Art Excellence Artist of the Year award in 2016
- Palm Award Winner 2016
- GAA Artist of the year 2016 and 2020
- Second-place in the Circle Foundation for the Arts Artist of the Year contest in 2020
- The Halo Infinite Masterpiece campaign earned three Cannes Lions nominations and a Silver Gerety Award in 2021
