= Annual Review of Physiology =

- Discipline: Physiology
- Language: English
- Edited by: Mark T. Nelson; Kenneth Walsh

Publication details
- History: 1939–present
- Publisher: Annual Reviews (US)
- Frequency: Annually
- Open access: Subscribe to Open
- Impact factor: 20.3 (2025)

Standard abbreviations
- ISO 4: Annu. Rev. Physiol.

Indexing
- CODEN: ARPHAD
- ISSN: 0066-4278 (print); 1545-1585 (web)
- OCLC no.: 938681293

Links
- Journal homepage

The Annual Review of Physiology is a peer-reviewed academic journal that publishes review articles about physiology. First published in 1939 through a collaboration between the American Physiological Society and Annual Reviews (AR), it was published solely by AR after 1962. It covers various aspects of physiology, including cardiac, renal, respiratory, and gastrointestinal physiology, among other subfields. As of 2023, Annual Review of Physiology is being published as open access, under the Subscribe to Open model. As of 2026, Journal Citation Reports lists the journal's 2025 impact factor as 20.3, ranking it second of 89 journal titles in the category "Physiology".

== History ==
In 1938, the Annual Review of Biochemistry, Ltd, publisher of the journal of the same name, and the American Physiological Society agreed to collaborate to create a new journal. As a result, the Annual Review of Biochemistry, Ltd, decided to change its name to reflect its expansion into other disciplines. It became Annual Reviews (AR), a nonprofit organization whose stated mission is to synthesize knowledge "for the progress of science and the benefit of society."

The first volume of AR's new journal, the Annual Review of Physiology, was published in 1939. The first editor of the journal was AR's founder J. Murray Luck, and the first editorial committee consisted of Anton Julius Carlson, John Farquhar Fulton, M. H. Jacobs, F. C. Mann, and Walter J. Meek as chairman.

In 1949, the journal discontinued chapters on physiological psychology and pathology, reflecting the inception of several new AR journals for psychology, medicine, chemistry, and plant physiology. It continued to be jointly published by AR and the American Physiological Society until 1962, at which time the APS withdrew for administrative reasons. As of 2020, it was published both in print and electronically. Some of its articles are available online in advance of the volume's publication date.

It defines as scope as covering various aspects of physiology, including cardiac, cell, respiratory, gastrointestinal, renal, comparative, and evolutionary physiologies, as well as neurophysiology and ecophysiology.

== Editorial processes ==
The Annual Review of Physiology is helmed by an editor or co-editors. The editor is assisted by the editorial committee, which includes associate editors, regular members, and occasionally guest editors. Guest members participate at the invitation of the editor, and serve terms of one year. All other members of the editorial committee are appointed by the AR board of directors and serve five-year terms. The editorial committee determines which topics should be included in each volume and solicits reviews from qualified authors. Unsolicited manuscripts are not accepted. Peer review of accepted manuscripts is undertaken by the editorial committee.

=== Editors of volumes ===
Dates indicate publication years in which someone was credited as a lead editor or co-editor of a journal volume. The planning process for a volume begins well before the volume appears, so appointment to the position of lead editor generally occurred prior to the first year shown here. An editor who has retired or died may be credited as a lead editor of a volume that they helped to plan, even if it is published after their retirement or death.

- J. Murray Luck (1939–1946)
- Victor E. Hall (1947–1971)
- Julius H. Comroe Jr. (1972–1975)
- Ernst Knobil (1976–1978)
- Isidore Edelman (1979–1982)
- Robert M. Berne (1983–1988)
- Joseph F. Hoffman (1989–2005)
- David Garbers (2006)
- David Julius (2007–2020)
- Mark T. Nelson and Kenneth Walsh (2021–present)
