= Suzanne Pfeffer =

American neuroscientist and academic

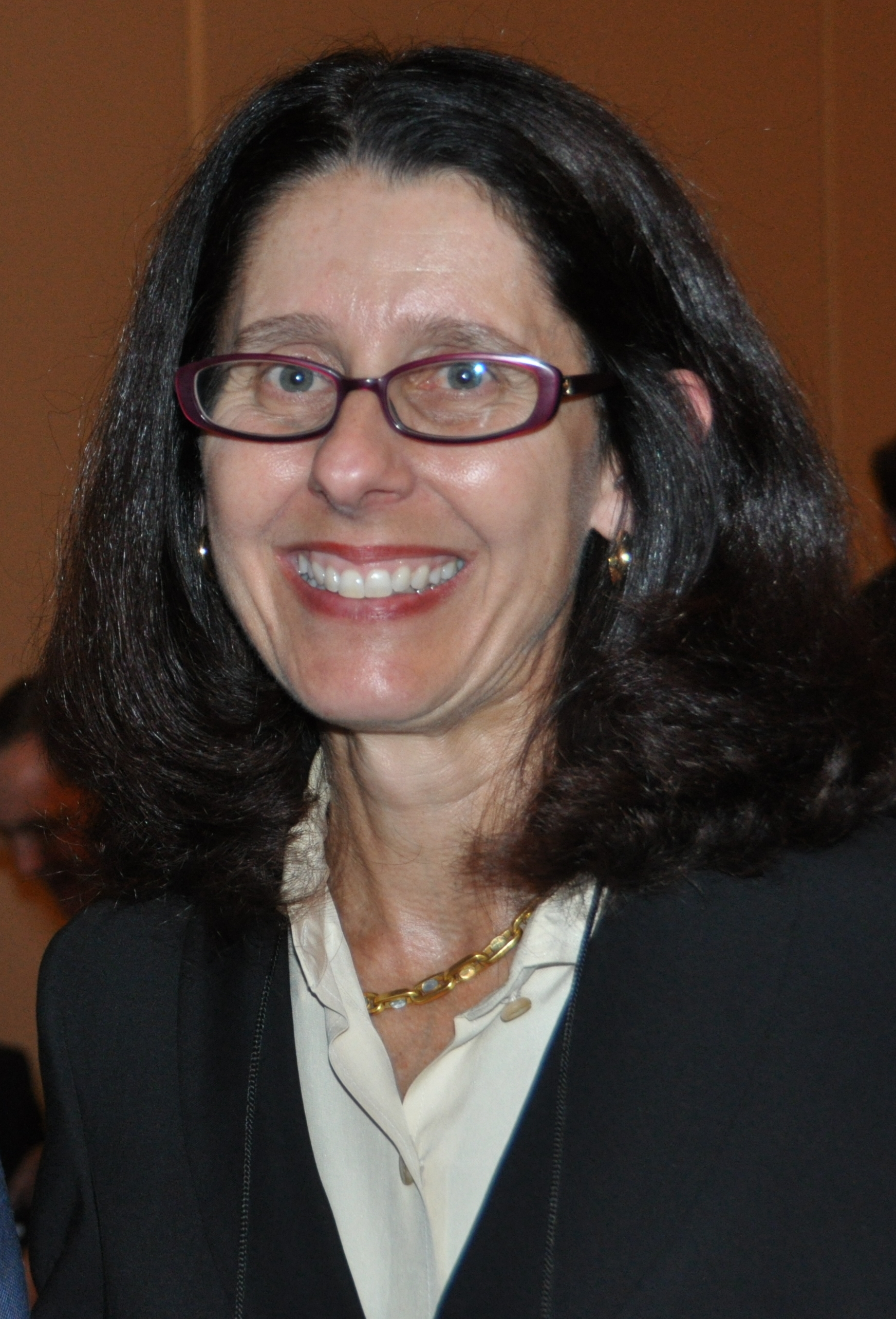
- Pfeffer in 2010
- Born: Suzanne Ruth Pfeffer
- Education: University of California, Berkeley (BS); University of California, San Francisco (PhD)
- Scientific career
- Fields: Parkinson's disease
- Workplaces: Stanford University
- Thesis: The role of coated vesicles in intracellular transport (1983)
- Website: profiles.stanford.edu/suzanne-pfeffer

Suzanne Ruth Pfeffer is an American neuroscientist who is a professor at Stanford University. Her research investigates the molecular mechanisms that cause receptors to be transported between membrane compartments in cells, and she is an expert in Rab GTPases and the molecular basis of inherited Parkinson's disease. She is a Fellow of the American Association for the Advancement of Science, American Academy of Arts and Sciences, the American Society for Biochemistry and Molecular Biology and the American Society for Cell Biology. She is the editor of the Annual Review of Biochemistry.

== Early life and education ==
Pfeffer has said that she became interested in human physiology as a child. She was an undergraduate student at the University of California, Berkeley, where she became interested in biochemistry. She worked with Michael Chamberlin on binding of Escherichia coli polymerase to T7 DNA polymerase. She moved to the University of California, San Francisco for her graduate studies, where she worked with Regis B. Kelly on synaptic vessels. Her doctoral research investigated the role of coated vesicles in intracellular transport.

== Research and career ==
After her PhD, she moved to Stanford University as a Hay Whitney postdoctoral fellow, where she worked with James Rothman on Golgi transport.

Pfeffer set up her own research program at Stanford University, where she was the first woman to be appointed to the department of biochemistry. Her research investigates the fundamental mechanisms of membrane trafficking.

=== Selected publications ===
- Biosynthetic protein transport and sorting by the endoplasmic reticulum and Golgi
- "Rab9 functions in transport between late endosomes and the trans Golgi network
- Rab GTPases: specifying and deciphering organelle identity and function

=== Awards and honors ===
- 1992 Elected Fellow of the American Association for the Advancement of Science
- 2003 President of the American Society for Cell Biology
- 2010 President of the American Society for Biochemistry and Molecular Biology
- 2013 Elected to the American Academy of Arts and Sciences
- 2017 Elected Fellow of the American Society for Cell Biology
- 2024 Elected member of the National Academy of Sciences
- 2025 Elected Fellow of the American Society for Biochemistry and Molecular Biology
