= Eddleman =

Eddleman is a surname. Notable people with the surname include:

- Clyde D. Eddleman (1902–1992), United States Army general
- Dwight Eddleman (1922–2001), American athlete

== See also ==
- Edelman
