= David Adelman =

David Adelman may refer to:

- David E. Adelman, American lawyer and academic
- David I. Adelman (born 1964), American lawyer, diplomat, and legislator
- David J. Adelman (born 1974), American businessman
- David Adelman (basketball) (born 1981), American professional basketball coach
