= Adleman =

Adleman is a surname. Notable people with the surname include:

- Leonard Adleman (born 1945), American theoretical computer scientist and professor of computer science and molecular biology
- Robert H. Adleman (1919–1995), American novelist and historian
- Tim Adleman (born 1987), American baseball player

== See also ==
- Adelman
- Edelmann
