= Addelman =

Addelman is a surname of German origin, and means "nobleman", being a combination of "adel" (nobility) and "mann" (man). Notable people with the surname include:

- Ben Addelman (born 1977), Canadian filmmaker
- Rebecca Addelman (born 1981), Canadian comedian, writer, director, and actress

== See also ==
- Adelman
