= Edelman =

Edelman is a surname. Notable people with the surname include:

- Abram M. Edelman, (1863–1941), American architect
- Abram Wolf Edelman (1832–1907), Polish-born American rabbi in California
- Adam Edelman (born 1991), American-born Israeli skeleton racer
- Alan Edelman (born 1963), American mathematician and computer scientist
- Alex Edelman (born 1989), American stand-up comedian
- Cornelis Hendrik "Cees" Edelman (1903–1964), Dutch soil scientist
- Daniel Edelman (1920–2013), American public relations executive, founder of Edelman
- Daniel Edelman (soccer) (born 2003), American soccer player
- David Louis Edelman (born 1971), American science fiction author
- Edmund D. Edelman (1930–2016), American politician from California
- Elazer R. Edelman, American engineer, scientist, and cardiologist
- Eric S. Edelman, American diplomat and politician
- Ezra Edelman, American documentary director
- Fanny Edelman (1911–2011), Argentine politician
- Gerald Edelman (1929–2014), biologist
- Gregg Edelman (born 1958), American actor
- Herb Edelman (1933–1996), American actor
- Isidore Edelman (1920–2004), American physician and researcher
- James Edelman (born 1974), Australian justice and academic
- Joseph Edelman (born 1955), American hedge fund manager and entrepreneur
- Judith Edelman (1923–2014), American architect
- Julian Edelman (born 1986), American football player
- Julius Edelman (1924–2004), jazz photographer known as Skippy Adelman
- Lee Edelman (born 1953), American professor of English
- Marek Edelman (1922–2009), political and social activist, cardiologist, last living leader of the Warsaw Ghetto uprising
- Marian Wright Edelman (Marian Wright) (born 1939), founder and president of the Children's Defense Fund, wife of Peter
- Maurice Edelman (1911–1975), British politician and novelist
- Murray Edelman (1919–2001), American political scientist
- Natan Eidelman (1930–1989), Russian author and historian
- Nufar Edelman (born 1982), Israeli sailor
- Peter Edelman (born 1938), American lawyer and legal scholar, husband of Marian
- Randy Edelman (born 1947), American composer
- R. David Edelman, American policymaker
- Richard Edelman (born 1954), American public relations businessman
- Scott Edelman (born 1955), American science fiction and fantasy writer and editor

== See also ==
- Edelman (firm), an American public relations firm
- Edelman v. Jordan, 1974 United States Supreme Court (11th amendment)
- Edelmann
- Adleman
