= Annual Review of Biochemistry =

- Discipline: Biochemistry
- Language: English
- Edited by: Suzanne Pfeffer

Publication details
- History: 1932–present, 94 years old
- Publisher: Annual Reviews (US)
- Frequency: Annually
- Open access: Subscribe to Open
- Impact factor: 24.9 (2025)

Standard abbreviations
- ISO 4: Annu. Rev. Biochem.

Indexing
- CODEN: ARBOAW
- ISSN: 0066-4154 (print); 1545-4509 (web)

Links
- Journal homepage

Annual Review of Biochemistry is an annual peer-reviewed scientific journal published by Annual Reviews (AR), a nonprofit organization whose stated mission is to synthesize knowledge "for the progress of science and the benefit of society". Its first volume was published in 1932, and its founding editor was J. Murray Luck. The current editor is Suzanne Pfeffer. The journal focuses on molecular biology and biological chemistry review articles. As of 2023, it is being published as open access, under the Subscribe to Open model. As of 2026, Journal Citation Reports gives the journal an impact factor of 24.9, ranking it sixth out of 328 journals in the category "Biochemistry and Molecular Biology".

== History ==
The Annual Review of Biochemistry was the creation of Stanford University chemist and professor J. Murray Luck. In 1930, Luck offered a course on current research in biochemistry to graduate students. In designing the course, he said he felt "knee-deep in trouble", as he believed he was sufficiently knowledgeable in only a few areas of biochemistry. He considered the volume of research to be overwhelming; there were 6,500 abstracts regarding biochemistry published in Chemical Abstracts that year. Luck asked about 50 biochemists in the US, United Kingdom, and Canada if an annual volume of critical reviews on biochemistry research would be useful, to which he received positive responses. This correspondence provided possible authors and topics for his first several volumes. Stanford University Press agreed to publish the journal on a three-year contract, with financial assistance from the Chemical Foundation. Stanford University gave the journal rent-free office space in 1931 for editorial and business operations. Prior to this, Luck's only experience in the publishing industry was working for a summer as a book salesman in Western Canada. Volume 1 was published in July 1932, consisting of 30 reviews from 35 authors of nine countries; the volume was 724 pages. Luck was the founding editor of the Annual Review of Biochemistry and held the editorship for thirty-five years.

At the completion of the contract with Stanford University Press, the advisory committee of the journal, which included Carl L. Alsberg, Denis Hoagland, and Carl L. A. Schmidt, decided to assume a legal identity as the journal's publisher, though keeping Stanford University Press as the printer. On December 12, 1934, they submitted articles of incorporation with the California Secretary of State to create Annual Review of Biochemistry, Ltd., which was organized as a nonprofit. In February 1938, the name was changed to Annual Reviews, Inc.

Prior to World War II, about half of all review articles published each volume were from authors outside the US. The war caused international scientific communication to drop off dramatically, with international authorship at 25% in 1947. The breadth of material within each volume lessened when AR added new titles in physiology and plant physiology.

== Editorial processes ==
The Annual Review of Biochemistry is helmed by the editor. The editor is assisted by the editorial committee, which includes associate editors, regular members, and occasionally guest editors. Guest members participate at the invitation of the editor and serve terms of one year. All other members of the editorial committee are appointed by the AR board of directors and serve five-year terms. The editorial committee determines which topics should be included in each volume and solicits reviews from qualified authors. Unsolicited manuscripts are not accepted. Peer review of accepted manuscripts is undertaken by the editorial committee.

=== Editors of volumes ===
Dates indicate publication years in which someone was credited as a lead editor or co-editor of a journal volume. The planning process for a volume begins well before the volume appears, so appointment to the position of lead editor generally occurred prior to the first year shown here. An editor who has retired or died may be credited as a lead editor of a volume that they helped to plan, even if it is published after their retirement or death.

- J. Murray Luck (1932–1962; 1965)
- Esmond E. Snell (1963–1964; 1969–1983)
- Paul D. Boyer (1966–1968)
- Charles C. Richardson (1984–2003)
- Roger D. Kornberg (2004–2026)
- Suzanne Pfeffer (2026–present)

=== Current editorial committee ===
As of 2025, the editorial committee consists of the editor and the following members:

- Gunnar von Heijne
- Emily Balskus
- Jesper Q. Svejstrup
- Michelle D. Wang
