= Dickson Prize =

American medicine award

The Dickson Prize in Medicine and the Dickson Prize in Science were both established in 1969 by Joseph Z. Dickson and Agnes Fischer Dickson.

== Dickson Prize in Medicine ==
The Dickson Prize in Medicine is awarded annually by the University of Pittsburgh and recognizes US citizens who have made "significant, progressive contributions" to medicine. The award includes $50,000, a bronze medal, and the Dickson Prize Lecture.

=== Recipients ===
Source: University of Pittsburgh

- 1971 Earl W. Sutherland Jr.
- 1972 Solomon A. Berson and Rosalyn S. Yalow
- 1973 John H. Gibbon Jr.
- 1974 Stephen W. Kuffler
- 1975 Elizabeth F. Neufeld
- 1976 Frank J. Dixon
- 1977 Roger Guillemin
- 1978 Paul Greengard
- 1979 Bert W. O'Malley
- 1980 David H. Hubel and Torsten N. Wiesel
- 1981 Philip Leder
- 1982 Francis H. Ruddle
- 1983 Eric R. Kandel
- 1984 Solomon H. Snyder
- 1985 Robert C. Gallo
- 1986 J. Michael Bishop
- 1987 Elvin A. Kabat
- 1988 Leroy E. Hood
- 1989 Bernard Moss
- 1990 Ernst Knobil
- 1991 Phillip A. Sharp
- 1992 Francis Sellers Collins
- 1993 Stanley B. Prusiner
- 1994 Bert Vogelstein
- 1995 Ronald M. Evans
- 1996 Philippa Marrack
- 1997 Ed Harlow and Eric Steven Lander
- 1998 Richard D. Klausner
- 1999 James E. Darnell Jr.
- 2000 Elizabeth H. Blackburn (Dickson Prize Lecture, April 13, 2000: "Telomere Capping and Cell Proliferation")
- 2001 Robert G. Roeder (Dickson Prize Lecture, September 12, 2001: "Regulation of Transcription in Human Cells: Complexities and Challenges")
- 2002 C. David Allis (Dickson Prize Lecture, September 18, 2002: "Translating the Histone Code: A Tale of Tails")
- 2003 Susan L. Lindquist (Dickson Prize Lecture, September 24, 2003: "Protein Conformation as a Pathway to Understanding Cellular Processes, Disease and Bio-Inspired Materials")
- 2004 Elaine Fuchs (Dickson Prize Lecture, 2004: "Skin Stem Cells and Their Lineages")
- 2005 Ronald W. Davis (Dickson Prize Lecture, 2005: "New Genomic Technology for Yeast Applied to Clinical Medicine")
- 2006 Roger D. Kornberg (Dickson Prize Lecture, October 5, 2006: "Chromatin and Transcription")
- 2007 Carol W. Greider (Dickson Prize Lecture, October 11, 2007: "Telomerase and the Consequences of Telomere Dysfunction")
- 2008 Randy W. Schekman (Dickson Prize Lecture, "Dissecting the Secretion Process: From Basic Mechanism to Human Disease")
- 2009 Victor Ambros (Dickson Prize Lecture, "MicroRNAs, from Model Organisms to Human Biology.")
- 2010 Stephen J. Elledge
- 2011 J. Craig Venter
- 2012 Brian J. Druker
- 2013 Huda Y. Zoghbi (Dickson Prize lecture, Thursday, October 3, 2013: "Rett Syndrome and MECP2 Disorders: From the Clinic to Genes and Neurobiology.")
- 2014 Jeffrey I. Gordon
- 2015 Karl Deisseroth
- 2016 Jennifer Doudna
- 2017 David M. Sabatini
- 2018 Bonnie Bassler
- 2019 Ruslan Medzhitov
- 2020 James J. Collins
- 2021 Cynthia Kenyon
- 2022 Carolyn Bertozzi
- 2023 Clifford Brangwynne
- 2024 Leslie B. Vosshall
- 2025 Cato T. Laurencin
- 2026 Xiaowei Zhuang

== Dickson Prize in Science ==
The Dickson Prize in Science is awarded annually by Carnegie Mellon University and recognizes those who "have made the most progress in the scientific field in the United States for the year in question." The award is dated by the year in which it was announced, which is often the year before the lecture occurs.

=== Recipients ===
Source: Carnegie Mellon University

- 1970–71 Richard Bellman
- 1971–72 George Palade and Keith Roberts Porter
- 1972–73 Francis L. Ver Snyder
- 1973–74 Elias J. Corey
- 1974–75 David H. Geiger, civil engineering
- 1975–76 – not awarded
- 1976–77 – not awarded
- 1977–78 John H. Sinfelt
- 1978–79 Seymour Benzer
- 1979–80 – not awarded
- 1980–81 John Werner Cahn
- 1981–82 – not awarded
- 1982–83 Harden M. McConnell
- 1983–84 Edward Fredkin
- 1985–86 Norman Davidson
- 1986–87 Benjamin Widom
- 1987–88 Mitchell Feigenbaum
- 1988–89 Joan A. Steitz
- 1989–90 Richard E. Dickerson
- 1990–91 F. Sherwood Rowland
- 1991–92 David Botstein
- 1992–93 Paul Lauterbur
- 1993–94 Vera Rubin
- 1994–95 Raymond Kurzweil
- 1995–96 Leland Hartwell
- 1996–97 John P. Hirth
- 1997–98 Walter Alvarez
- 1998–99 Peter Shor, 25th recipient (Dickson Lecture, November 8, 1999, "Quantum Computing")
- 1999–2000 Howard Raiffa (Dickson Lecture, Tue. April 4, 2000: "Analytical Roots of a Decision Scientist"
- 2000–01 Alexander Pines (Dickson Lecture, April 11, 2001: "Some Magnetic Moments"
- 2001–02 Carver Mead (Dickson Lecture, March 19, 2002: "The Coming Revolution in Photography")
- 2002–03 Robert Langer (Dickson Lecture, February 26, 2003: "Biomaterials And How They Will Change Our Lives")
- 2003–04 Marc W. Kirschner (Dickson Lecture, March 30, 2004: "Timing the Inner Cell Cycle")
- 2004–05 George Whitesides (Dickson Lecture, March 28, 2005: "Assumptions: If common assumptions about the modern world break down, then what could science and technology make happen?")
- 2005–06 David Haussler (Dickson Lecture, March 9, 2006: "Ultraconserved elements, living fossil transposons, and rapid bursts of change: reconstructing the uneven evolutionary history of the human genome"
- 2006–07 Jared Diamond (Dickson Lecture, March 26, 2007: "Collapse")
- 2007–08 Jean Fréchet
- 2008–09 Richard M. Karp
- 2009–10 Saul Perlmutter (Dickson Lecture, March 17, 2010: "Stalking Dark Energy & the Mystery of the Accelerating Universe")
- 2010–11 David A. Tirrell
- 2011–12 Marvin L. Cohen (March 8, 2012: "Einstein, Condensed Matter Physics, Nanoscience & Superconductivity")
- 2012–13 François M. M. Morel (March 12, 2013: "Ocean Acidification: Causes, Time Scales & Consequences")
- 2013–14 Karl Deisseroth (February 3, 2014: "Illuminating the Brain")
- 2014–15 Joseph M. DeSimone (February 16, 2015: "Breakthroughs in Imprint Lithography and 3D Additive Fabrication")
- 2015 Judea Pearl (February 29, 2016 : "Science, Counterfactuals and Free Will")
- 2016 Chad A. Mirkin (February 2, 2017 : "Nanotechnology: Small Things Matter")
- 2017 Jennifer Doudna (February 1, 2018: "CRISPR Systems: Nature's Toolkit for Genome Editing")
- 2018 Emery N. Brown (January 31, 2019: "The Dynamics of the Unconscious Brain Under General Anesthesia")
- 2019 Geraldine Richmond (February 11, 2020: "Surf, Sink or Swim: Understanding Environmentally Important Processes at Water Surfaces")
- 2020 Lucy Shapiro
- 2021 Geoffrey Hinton
- 2022 Richard Aslin
- 2023 Jennifer Lippincott-Schwartz
- 2024 Gilda A. Barabino
- 2025 Aviv Regev

== See also ==
- List of medicine awards
