= Do No Harm (organization) =

Medical and policy advocacy group

- Formation: Tax-exempt since July 2022; 4 years ago
- Type: 501(c)(3)
- Headquarters: Glen Allen, Virginia
- Revenue: $5.24 million (2023)
- Expenses: $4.72 million (2023)
- Website: donoharmmedicine.org

Do No Harm Action
- Formation: 2023; 3 years ago
- Type: 501(c)(4)
- Tax ID no.: 922849295
- Revenue: 833,749 USD (2024)
- Expenses: 1,276,663 USD (2024)

Do No Harm is a United States medical and policy advocacy group founded in 2022 by Stanley Goldfarb.

The group opposes gender-affirming care for minors and diversity, equity and inclusion (DEI) efforts in medicine and medical education, including race-conscious medical school admissions and other identity-based considerations regarding health care decision-making. Do No Harm drafts model legislation for state legislatures to ban gender-affirming care for minors. It argues that racial discrimination in medical school admissions will result in lower standards of care, and that diversity training within the health care system places politics ahead of care.

== History ==
Do No Harm was founded in 2022 by Stanley Goldfarb, a retired kidney specialist and former associate dean of curriculum at the University of Pennsylvania Medical School, with funding from Joseph Edelman's Edelman Family Foundation and the Project on Fair Representation, a conservative legal group.

The group's initial focus was opposing anti-racism in healthcare education and hiring. The group was formed to "[protect] patients and physicians from woke healthcare", according to an April 2022 press release. Do No Harm was founded as a tax-exempt, charity organization, undertaking lobbying efforts in Kansas, Missouri, and Tennessee through 2022, before expanding to Florida in 2023.

In March 2023, the group incorporated a second group, Do No Harm Action, which operates as a lobbying arm.

The Southern Poverty Law Center (SPLC) has designated Do No Harm as an anti-LGBT hate group.

=== Model legislation to ban gender-affirming care for minors ===
According to the Associated Press, the group by 2023 had "evolved into a significant leader in statehouses seeking to ban gender-affirming care for transgender youths". It developed model legislation state legislatures could introduce to ban such care; by May 2023, 130 bills in 40 US states (and British Columbia, Canada) had language attributable to Do No Harm.

According to the Associated Press, the model legislation has been criticized by Meredithe McNamara, assistant professor of pediatrics at the Yale School of Medicine, for "using technical medical terminology as political rhetoric to scare people". According to Columbia University's Jack Drescher, editor of the gender dysphoria section of the American Psychiatric Association's 2022 diagnostic manual update, the model legislation language is "designed to inflame".

=== Medical school and health care diversity ===
According to Goldfarb, a focus on skin color in medical schools means "we're not going to look for the best and the brightest. We're going to look for people who are just OK to make sure we have the right mixture of ethnic groups in our medical schools." Goldfarb published a book Take Two Aspirin and Call Me By My Pronouns: Why Turning Doctors into Social Justice Warriors is Destroying American Medicine.

In 2023, Do No Harm issued a report titled Racial Concordance in Medicine: The Return of Segregation which found "no relationship between race or ethnicity concordance and the quality of communication, and inconclusive evidence for patient outcomes." Racial concordance in medicine refers to matching the races of physicians and patients.

Through 2025, Do No Harm had raised litigation specific to diversity-related hiring against Duke University, the University of Colorado, the University of Washington School of Medicine, the National Association of Emergency Medical Technicians, the Society of Military Orthopedic Surgeons, Pfizer, and Montana Governor Greg Gianforte.

=== Activism ===
On December 4, 2024, during the oral arguments for a Supreme Court case, Do No Harm organized a rally on the courthouse steps to support a state-level ban on gender-affirming care for minors when parental consent was lacking. In June 2025, the court ruled 6–3 in United States v. Skrmetti that a such a ban was constitutional.
