= Joseph Edelman =

American hedge fund manager (born 1955)

- Born: 1955 (age 70–71)
- Education: BS, Psychology, 1978, University of California, San Diego; MBA, New York University Stern School of Business, 1988
- Occupation: Hedge fund manager
- Known for: Biotechnology investments Edelman Family Foundation
- Board member of: Brown University (former); New York Genome Center; Athira Pharma
- Spouse: Susan "Suzy" Lebovitz-Edelman
- Parent: Isidore Edelman

Joseph Edelman (born 1955) is an American hedge fund manager who founded Perceptive Advisors, a New York City-based hedge fund specializing in the healthcare sector and biotechnology. He helped take biotech firms public via the use of special-purpose acquisition companies.

== Early life and education ==
Edelman's father, Isidore Edelman, was a scientist who became a professor emeritus of biochemistry and molecular biophysics at Columbia's College of Physicians and Surgeons. Edelman was the third of four children and grew up in San Francisco.

Edelman graduated magna cum laude with a degree in psychology from the University of California, San Diego in 1978. Subsequently, he enrolled in graduate studies in pharmacology but left the program upon realizing that he sought a different career path than that of his father.

Drawn to the finance sector, he relocated to New York City, where he obtained his MBA from New York University's Stern School of Business in 1988. To support himself during his studies, he worked in accounting, including his role as assistant comptroller for the Actors' Equity Association.

== Career ==
Edelman began his career in 1987 as a biotechnology analyst at brokerage Wall Street Labe, Simpson & Company before moving to Prudential Securities as senior biotech analyst in 1990. In 1994, Edelman joined Paramount Capital Asset Management, running The Aries Funds until 1998. He joined First New York Securities in February 1999, a proprietary trading firm that allocated $6 million for him to manage an account.

In July 1999, Edelman founded Perceptive Advisors, a hedge fund firm focused on identifying and investing in promising technologies and innovations in the field of biotechnology. The firm began with $6 million in assets and grew to $4.1 billion by 2018. By 2018, its flagship hedge fund, the Perceptive Life Sciences Fund, had delivered annualized gains of 30 percent net of fees since its inception.

Edelman's firm's assets further grew to $8 billion in April 2023 and $10 billion in July that year. In addition to Perceptive Life Sciences, he has invested in small and mid-cap biotech firms such as CymaBay Therapeutics and Cerevel Therapeutics.

Edelman played a significant role in the establishment of ARYA Sciences Acquisition Corp I, II, III, IV, and V. The special purpose acquisition companies (SPACs) were created to facilitate mergers, acquisitions, and public listings for companies in the biotechnology, pharmaceutical, and healthcare industries. In 2022, Perceptive settled charges with the U.S. Securities and Exchange Commission (SEC), accepting a censure and paying a $1.5 million fine. The SEC claimed that the firm had failed to disclose to investors that the firm's employees had stakes in the SPACs the investors were directed to.

Edelman is on the boards of directors at the New York Genome Center, Athira Pharma, and Xontogeny, a support firm for early-stage life science companies. In September 2024, he resigned from the Brown University board of trustees over a planned vote on divestment from Israel.

== Edelman Family Foundation ==
Edelman established the Edelman Family Foundation, based in New York City, in 2017. According to an investigation by the Huffington Post, the foundation was the primary funder enabling the creation of Do No Harm, an advocacy group that opposes anti-racism education in public schools and gender-affirming care for minors; the donation is characterized by the Foundation in its IRS filing as "to provide support to protect healthcare from a radical, divisive, and discriminatory ideology".

Other recipients of Foundation funds include the Cato Institute, the Foundation Against Intolerance and Racism, the Foundation for Individual Rights and Expression, the Manhattan Institute (funds, according to tax filings, intended to support a “gender identity initiative”), Parents Defending Education, PragerU, and the non-accredited University of Austin (UATX). The Foundation stopped providing funding to the Center for Reproductive Rights due to what the Foundation described as the center's "adoption of gender ideology".

== Personal life ==
He is married to Susan "Suzy" Lebovitz-Edelman, who is co-chair of the Edelman Family Foundation. She was educated at Princeton Day School, and earned a bachelor's degree from Brown University.

In 2021, they bought an 18,000 square foot oceanfront mansion in a gated community in Laguna Beach, California for US$70 million, a record for Orange County.
