= Mark T. Nelson =

American scientist

- Born: New York City
- Citizenship: US
- Education: Tufts University; Washington University in St. Louis
- Scientific career
- Institutions: University of Miami; University of Vermont

Mark Tuxford Nelson (born May 29, 1954) is an American scientist who researches the regulation of blood flow in the brain. He was elected to the National Academy of Sciences in 2019.

== Early life and education ==
Mark Tuxford Nelson was born in 1954 in New York City and grew up in River Edge, New Jersey. His father Arthur Tuxford Nelson was a World War II veteran who worked for Union Carbide as a journalist for their technical literature, and his mother Gloria Anson Nelson was an art teacher at a public school. For his undergraduate degree, he attended Tufts University where he studied mathematics and biology. He then attended Washington University in St. Louis for his PhD under the advisement of Mordecai Blaustein, graduating in 1980. He did post-doctoral research at the University of Maryland and the University of Konstanz in Germany.

== Career ==
He briefly taught at the University of Miami from 1984 to 1986 before accepting a position at the University of Vermont in 1986; he became the chair of their pharmacology department in 1995. Nelson's research is primarily focused on how bloodflow in the brain responds to neuronal activity. He researches the ion channels in endothelial and smooth muscle cells. His research is applicable to small vessel disease responsible for dementia and stroke.

Along with Kenneth Walsh, he succeeded David Julius in 2021 as the co-editor of the peer-reviewed journal the Annual Review of Physiology.

He is a member of the editorial board for PNAS.

== Awards and honors ==
Nelson is a member of several scientific societies, including the Vermont Academy of Arts and Sciences and Vermont Academy of Sciences and Engineering. In 2019, Nelson was elected as a member of the National Academy of Sciences. He was elected a Fellow of the Academy of Medical Sciences (FMedSci) in 2026.
