= Ernst Knobil =

- Born: September 20, 1926; Berlin, Germany
- Died: April 13, 2000 (aged 73)
- Occupation: Endocrinologist
- Known for: Endocrinology
- Spouse: Julane Hotchkiss
- Awards: Dickson Prize (1990)

Ernst Knobil (September 20, 1926 – April 13, 2000) was a scientist known for his pioneering research in endocrinology. His discoveries were important for the field of reproductive endocrinology, the development of hormonal contraceptives, and treatments for infertility.

Knobil was the Richard Beatty Mellon Professor of Physiology at the University of Pittsburgh from 1961–1981 and later held named professorships at the University of Texas Health Science Center at Houston. Knobil was the editor of the peer-reviewed journal Annual Review of Physiology from 1976–1978. He served as president of the American Physiological Society, The Endocrine Society and the International Society of Endocrinology.

== Education ==
Ernst Knobil was born in Berlin and lived in Paris before emigrating with his family to the United States in 1940. He served in the U.S. Army during World War II. Returning to the United States, he studied zoology at Cornell University, earning his B.S. in 1948 and his PhD in 1951.

== Career ==
Knobil taught physiology at Harvard Medical School beginning in 1953, becoming an associate professor (1955) and assistant professor (1957). From 1961 to 1981, Knobil served as the Richard Beatty Mellon Professor of Physiology at the University of Pittsburgh. He also served as Chairman of the Department of Physiology at the University of Pittsburgh School of Medicine. From 1974 to 1981, he directed UPitt's Center for Research in Primate Reproduction.

In 1981 Knobil moved to the University of Texas Medical School at Houston, part of the Texas Medical Center. There he became the H. Wayne Hightower Professor in Medical Sciences and the Director of the Laboratory for Neuroendocrinology. He also served as Dean from 1981–1984. In 1989, Knobil became the Ashbel Smith Professor at the University of Texas-Houston Health Science Center.

== Research ==
Knobil's research into hormonal regulation in primates led to his discovery of growth hormone's species-specific effects. These discoveries led to the first treatment of growth hormone deficiency.

Knobil is also credited with discovering the key role of pulsatile gonadotropin-releasing hormone and estrogen feedback during the menstrual cycle. This work today forms the basis of reproductive endocrinology and enabled development of the world's first hormonal contraceptives. His research also led to better treatments for infertility.

In addition to being the author of 217 scientific papers, he was the editor of several reference books in endocrinology and reproduction, including The Handbook of Physiology (1974), The Physiology of Reproduction (1988, 1994) and The Encyclopedia of Reproduction (1998).

Knobil served as President of The Endocrine Society (1976–1977), American Physiological Society (1979), and International Society of Endocrinology (1984–1988). Knobil was the editor of the peer-reviewed journal Annual Review of Physiology from 1976–1978.

== Awards ==
- 1990, Dickson Prize, University of Pittsburgh School of Medicine
- 1986, Member, National Academy of Sciences
- 1985, Axel Munthe Award in the Field of Reproduction
- 1983, Carl G. Hartman Award, Society for the Study of Reproduction
- 1982, Fred Conrad Koch Award, The Endocrine Society
- 1961, CIBA Award, The Endocrine Society

== Archives ==
- Ernst Knobil, PhD papers, McGovern Historical Center, Texas Medical Center Library
