= Robert V. Levine =

American psychologist (1945–2019)

- Born: Robert Victor Levine; August 25, 1945; Brooklyn, New York, U.S.
- Died: June 22, 2019 (aged 73); Santa Rosa, California, U.S.
- Education: University of California, Berkeley; Florida State University; New York University Ph.D.
- Scientific career
- Fields: Social psychology
- Institutions: California State University, Fresno

Notes
- Isidore Edelman (uncle)

Robert Victor Levine, Ph.D. (August 25, 1945 – June 22, 2019) was an American psychologist. Levine was professor of psychology at California State University, Fresno, a social psychology writer, speaker, and consultant. He was also the former associate dean of the College of Science and Mathematics at Fresno.

== Life ==
Levine grew up in Brooklyn, New York. His mother, Esther Edelman Levine, was also a professor of school psychology at Queens College, City University of New York. After graduating high school in 1963, he enrolled in University of California, Berkeley, which he graduated in 1967. After completing his bachelor's degree, Levine continued his education in Florida State University in clinical psychology in 1969, and later a Ph.D. in personality and social psychology from New York University in 1974. Later he moved to California State University, Fresno, where he was the professor of psychology and later chairperson of the department, as well as associate dean of the College of Science and Mathematics.

He continued to serve as a visiting professor at Universidade Federal Fluminense in Niterói, Brazil, at Sapporo Medical University in Japan, Stockholm University in Sweden, and in 2007 as a fellow of the Institute of Advanced Study at Durham University in the United Kingdom.

Levine's main focus in research was on the social psychology of time. He is particularly interested in how different cultures view and use their time, which cities and countries are fastest and slowest, and how the differences affect the quality of the lives of people who live in such places. In one program, Levine and his students compared 31 countries around the world regarding their pace of everyday life. For example, in one experiment, they timed the average walking speed of random pedestrians over the distance of 60 feet. He concluded that the fastest big cities tend to come from Western Europe and industrialized Asia, whereas economically struggling countries tend to be the slowest. Overall his studies concluded three things: "Places differ markedly in their overall speed of life. These differences are to at least some degree predictable by demographic, economic and environmental characteristics. And, these differences have consequences for the well-being of individuals."

In addition, he also did research in persuasion and manipulation by studying hucksters, magicians, and mentalists in order to see how people use their skills in order to control lives. Levine studied happiness by looking at the social and psychological quality of life. By working with the United Nations and the country of Bhutan, he explored how to enhance world happiness. Lastly, he studied the self, where he researched "an array of characters and conditions that challenge our assumptions about who we are and, most importantly, what we are capable of becoming."

He published three books. A Geography of Time, which talks about how different people and cultures deal with the concept of time. He went around the world and measured how long it took individuals to perform simple tasks. His second book is called The Power of Persuasion: How We’re Bought and Sold, which discusses how people prod, praise, and manipulate others into doing things they did not believe they could do, and later feel guilty for doing so. His third book is Stranger in the Mirror: The Scientific Search for the Self; this book explains the "contrasting the physical existence of the brain and the ethereal notion of the self cannot provide the answer he seeks." Levine believes that this is harming as it does not address the malleability of one's self. He has also co-edited two books: Reflections on 100 Years of Experimental Social Psychology and Journeys in Social Psychology: Looking Back to Inspire the Future.

Levine also won awards in teaching and research, the most recent being the Provost's Award for University Outstanding Teacher of the Year, California State University, Fresno in 2007. He taught social psychology, persuasion and mind control, supervised field experience in psychology, and other courses. In an interview with the Association for Psychological Science, Levine said he believes the key to being a great researcher is having passion for research in and working on questions that the researcher is truly curious about. He said: "Have patience, persistence and enthusiasm and you’ll be fine."

Levine contracted a disease in a humanitarian project in Nepal and died in Santa Rosa, California at the age of 73.
