= Uri Adelman =

Israeli writer, musician, and academic

- אורי אדלמן
- Born: September 3, 1958; Ramat Gan, Israel
- Died: August 5, 2004 (aged 45); Tel Aviv, Israel
- Occupations: Writer, musician, composer, computer expert, professor
- Writing career
- Genres: Thriller, fantasy
- Notable works: Concerto for Spy and Orchestra, Lost and Found

Uri Adelman (Hebrew: אורי אדלמן; September 3, 1958 – August 5, 2004) was an Israeli writer, musician, composer, computer expert, and professor at Tel Aviv University.

== Biography ==
Adelman was born and raised in Ramat Gan, near Tel Aviv, the 8th generation of a German-Jewish family hailing from Jerusalem. Adelman used the TAU's musicology department where he worked as a setting for his first thriller novel, Concerto for Spy and Orchestra. His second novel, Lost and Found, was a fantasy novel about Ashkenazi moshavnik Mossad agents, who alternated frequenting the Jerusalem Cinematheque with flying secretly to Cyprus. Written using short chapters and clear, direct Hebrew, the novels were bestsellers in Israel, culminating in translations to German, Greek and Japanese. Critics in Israel praised Lost and Found as "the perfect Israeli thriller", and his writing has received favourable comparisons with John Grisham.

In addition to 4 novels, Adelman wrote computer textbooks for the general public. He died from a heart attack in a hotel room in Ramat Aviv, Tel Aviv, where he was writing his next thriller.

== Works ==
- Concerto for Spy and Orchestra (Hebrew: קונצ'רטו למרגל ולתזמורת)
- Lost and Found (Hebrew: משוואה עם נעלם)
- Tropic of Venus (Hebrew: בסימן ונוס)
- The Graveyard Shift (Hebrew: שעות מתות)
