= Kenneth Andrew Walsh =

Canadian biochemist

- Education: University of Toronto
- Scientific career
- Fields: Biochemistry
- Workplaces: University of Washington

Kenneth Andrew Walsh is a Canadian biochemist who has spent most of his career in the United States and is now professor emeritus of biochemistry at the University of Washington.

== Education ==
Walsh received his Ph.D. from the University of Toronto, and became a Postdoctoral Fellow of Dr. Hans Neurath at the University of Washington in the early 1960s.

== Career ==
Walsh joined the faculty at the University of Washington and in 1992, he became Department chairperson.

Walsh's research on protein chemistry was recognized with the 2002 Pehr Edman Award. The award citation states that:

Of particular importance is his early work improving strategies for automated sequencing of proteins and identifying posttranslational modifications. These analyses contributed to concepts regarding the evolution of protein structure and function through gene duplication, the gradual divergence of their sequences, and gene fusions. He was among the first to draw attention to the power of mass spectrometry techniques for protein characterization.

Walsh has published 58 papers.
