= Isidore Edelman =

American physician and researcher

- Born: July 24, 1920; New York City, U.S.
- Died: November 21, 2004 (aged 84); New York City, U.S.
- Education: Indiana University Bloomington
- Partner(s): Florence Edelman (m. 1942; div. 1974) Roslyn Ross
- Children: Arthur Edelman; Susan Bleckner; Joseph Edelman; Ann Korchin
- Scientific career
- Institutions: Greenpoint Hospital; U.S. Army Medical Corps; Montefiore Medical Center; Peter Bent Brigham Hospital; University of California, San Francisco

Notes
- Robert V. Levine (nephew)

Isidore Samuel Edelman (July 24, 1920 – November 21, 2004) was an American physician and researcher. Much of his research was devoted to the study of the distribution of water and electrolytes in the body in healthy and diseased persons. In recognition of his research, he was elected as a member of the National Academy of Sciences in 1973.

== Early life and education ==
Isidore Samuel Edelman was born on July 24, 1920, in Brooklyn, New York City. His parents, Abraham and Fanny Edelman, were both Jewish immigrants; his mother arrived from Poland at about fifteen years old, and his father had immigrated from Lithuania at age fifteen or sixteen. He had a brother, Jerome Edelman, and sister, Esther Edelman Levine. Edelman first attended Brooklyn College before transferring to Indiana University Bloomington, where he received a bachelor's degree in chemistry. He was a member of the Phi Beta Kappa honor society. He was rejected from seventeen medical schools before ultimately returning to Indiana University for medical school, graduating in 1944 with his Doctor of Medicine.

== Career ==
After graduating with his MD, he returned to Brooklyn to intern at Greenpoint Hospital. He then served in the U.S. Army Medical Corps from 1945 to 1947, serving in the psychiatry division in Panama. Following his discharge from the Army, he completed his medical residency at Montefiore Medical Center in the Bronx. In 1951, he began working at Peter Bent Brigham Hospital at Harvard Medical School as a fellow of the United States Atomic Energy Commission; working with Francis Daniels Moore, he used deuterium and radioactive isotopes to examine how various diseases changed the distribution of water and electrolytes within the body. After his funding was withdrawn by the Atomic Energy Commission, the American Heart Association made him one of their first established investigators. In 1954 was hired by the University of California, San Francisco. In his laboratory at the San Francisco General Hospital, he continued his research on fluid and sodium distribution in the body, including edema.

In 1978, he joined Columbia University as the chair of the biochemistry and molecular biophysics department. He succeeded Ernst Knobil as editor of the Annual Review of Physiology in 1979, holding the position until 1982. He became the co-director of Columbia's Human Genome Program in 1991, and in 1995 became director of the genome center. He retained his leadership at the genome center until 2000.

== Awards and honors ==
In 1973, he became an elected member of the National Academy of Sciences. In 1996, he was awarded the Robert H. Williams Distinguished Leadership Award from the Endocrine Society. He was awarded the A.N. Richards Award in 1999 from the International Society of Nephrology.

== Personal life and death ==
Edelman was friends with several members of the Communist Party USA, with whom he would attend social gatherings. He said he attended two party meetings in 1943 in Indianapolis, and briefly had a subscription to the Daily Worker. He was eventually brought before the House Un-American Activities Committee and asked to name names. Likely as a result of this, the Atomic Energy Commission withdrew his research fellowship and funding. Harvard did not offer a defense of Edelman nor of other faculty accused of anti-American activities. Edelman remained grateful to the American Heart Association for making the politically risky move of offering him funding after he was accused of un-American activities; he requested that charitable donations after his death be made to the AHA.

Edelman was twice married. He and his first wife Florence married in 1942 and had four children together, two sons (including Joseph Edelman) and two daughters. They divorced in 1974 after thirty-two years of marriage. His second marriage was to Roslyn Ross. Idelman died in Manhattan on November 21, 2004, at the age of 84 from gastrointestinal cancer.
