= Environmental epigenetics =

Influence the environment on gene expression

Environmental epigenetics is a branch of epigenetics that studies the effects of external environmental factors on the gene expression of a developing embryo. These factors do not alter the genetic code, but genes affected may be passed down from parent to offspring through epigenetic modifications.

During development, exposure to certain environmental factors can influence epigenetic modifications, which can be harmful to offspring and increase the risk of developmental disorders or disease. Epigenetic modifications such as DNA methylation and histone modification, alter how genes are expressed through turning on or off specific genes, ultimately affecting the embryo's phenotype.

These environmental factors are referred to as triggers and can involve anything that influences normal gene expression without changing the DNA sequence itself. Some of the most common environmental triggers leading to epigenetic change include diet, temperature, lifestyle choices, stress, exposure to chemicals, and exposure to industrial pollutants. These triggers can cause low birth weight, neurological disorders, cancers, autoimmune diseases, and many other malformations.

== Anyone with a Genome is Predisposed to Epigenetic Effects ==
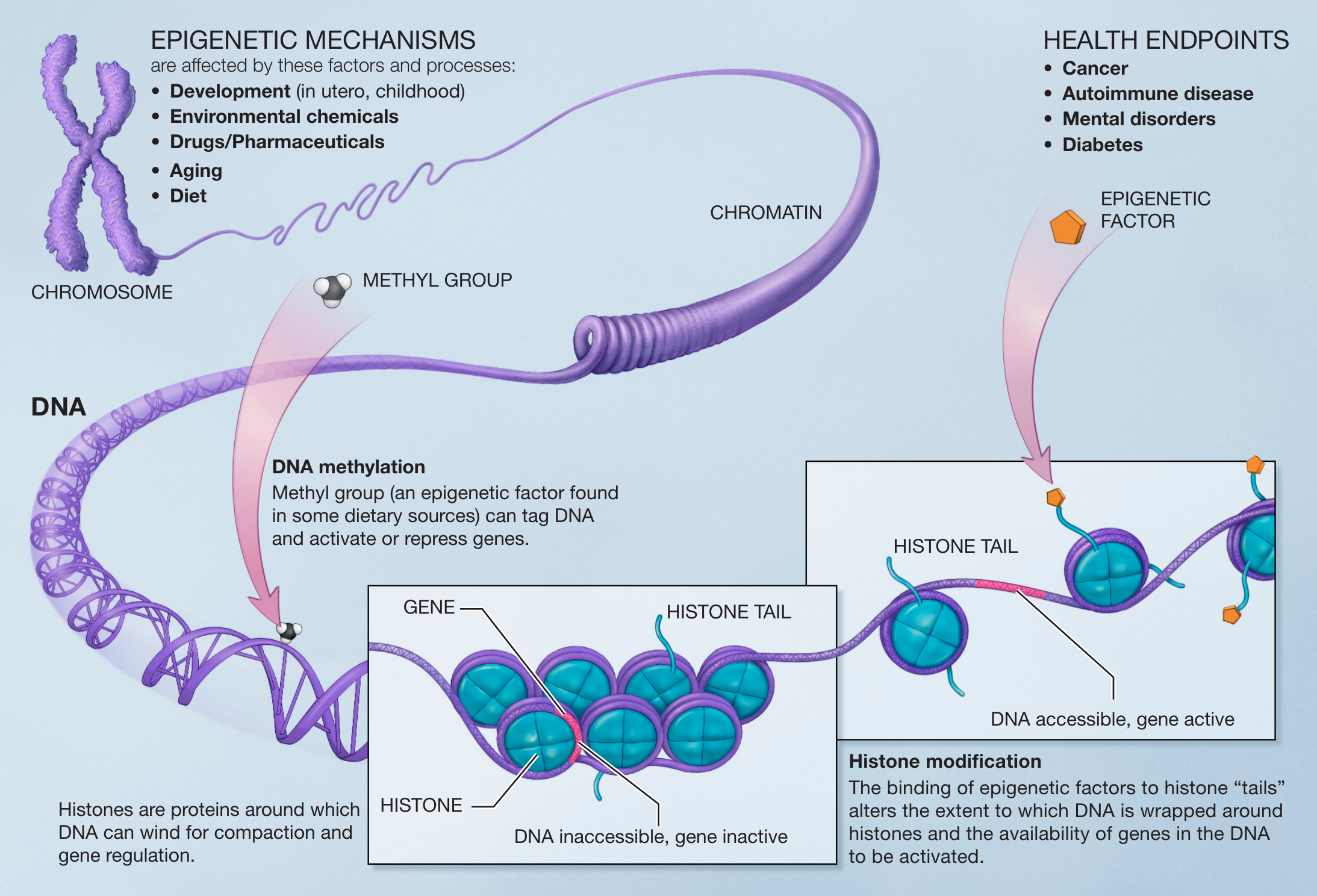
Epigenetic Mechanism demonstrating how DNA methylation can turn on or off genes.

But, who's most at risk?

Environmental exposures primarily affect embryos and children, but exposure can occur throughout your lifetime, and the effects can be lifelong and passed on.

Due to the complexity of fertilization, it is not completely known how the germline mechanism works throughout generations, but epigenetic reprogramming is well known. Epigenetic reprogramming occurs to ensure totipotency and reduce the number of negative gene modifications and mutations. Although this reprogramming occurs in the germ line cells, some modifications will be passed on to the 3rd generation.

A common example of this phenomenon is a grandparent's chemical exposure to the insecticide DDT and materials, like plastic, containing bisphenol A, increasing a grandchild's risk of experiencing early puberty, obesity, and fertility issues. Once a child is born, their genome can be modified by toxins and stress exposure can cause offspring epigenome to rearrange, resulting in disease later in life

== Examples of Triggers ==
=== Nutrients ===
Offspring can experience phenotypic changes depending on their access to nutrients. When nutrients are limited during pregnancy, the offspring's phenotypic expression can be disrupted. Nutrient intake is also important during lactation for the purpose of transferring nutrients to the offspring.

=== Stress during pregnancy ===
Pregnancy is a significant life event that brings many hormonal changes. Stress during pregnancy can have adverse effects on both humans and animals. These stressors can be emotional or physical and have an impact not only on the mother but on the offspring as well. Understanding the causes and effects of stressors during pregnancy is important for managing the well-being of both mother and offspring.

Exposure to maternal stressors can increase the likelihood of either overexpressing or suppressing DNA expression. When high levels of depression or stress are experienced in animals, it can result in smaller litter sizes and lower birth rates. This is believed to be due to decreased hormone production. Without adequate hormone production, ovulation may be affected, leading to fewer eggs and reduced potential offspring. Hormones also regulate the nutrients available to the offspring and assist in building the immune system. Reduced hormone levels can lead to miscarriages, underdevelopment, and weak offspring.

Oxidative stress in offspring can come from environmental factors or actions. Drinking and smoking are some of the leading causes of birth defects in humans. Drinking during pregnancy can have a significant effect on an unborn child. Brain abnormalities and stunted growth are only two of the numerous impacts of Fetal Alcohol Spectrum Disorder. Smoking during pregnancy is another major oxidative stressor, causing changes in growth genes, and has been linked to premature, undersized babies that may also have cognitive issues throughout life. Smoking is not the only cause of oxidative stress through inhalation; air pollution can also alter gene methylation, potentially increasing the offspring's risk of early-onset vascular disease.

Extreme stress during pregnancy can cause changes in the baby's stress response gene (NR3C1), which regulates cortisol levels in the body. These changes can cause sensitivity to stress later on in life. This can lead to anxiety, depression, and attention deficits in both children and adults. Early stress can also impact brain development, leading to long-lasting effects on mental health and behavior.

There are many clinically proven ways to manage stress during pregnancy. Meditation, yoga, and breathing exercises have been proven to lower stress hormone levels and can decrease prenatal depression and anxiety. When the expectant mother experiences less stress, it also reduces stress for the baby, leading to better health outcomes for both mother and child.

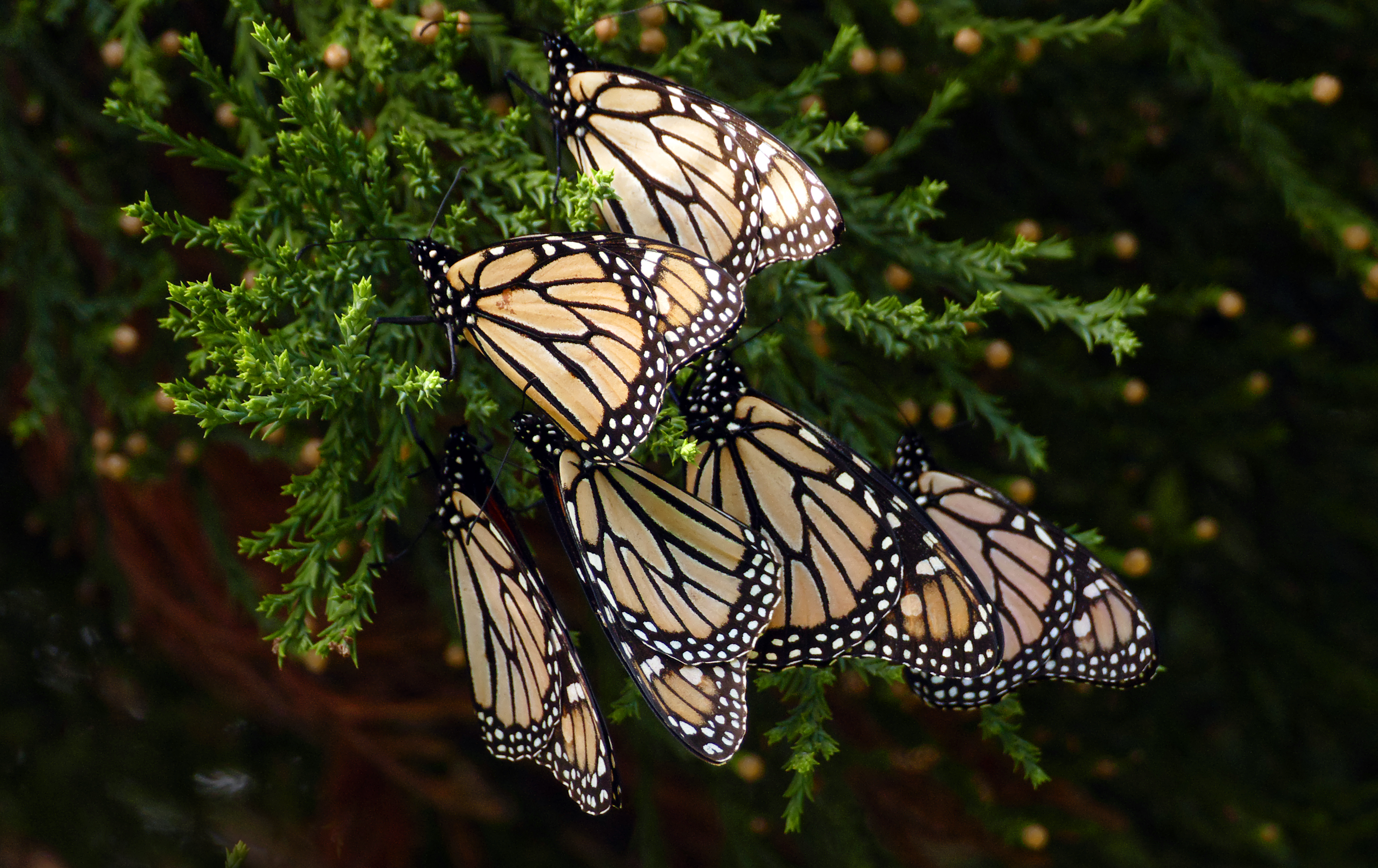
Cold weather affects the likelihood of a butterfly finding a mate and reproducing, as well as their coloring. These insects are dependent on their coloring to survive and reproduce.

=== Temperature ===
Changes in temperature can have varied effects on an organism. DNA methylation can be impacted by temperature when the temperature deviates from its normal value, preventing regular processes from taking place. Temperature can be considered a stressor in environmental epigenetics since it has the potential to change how offspring respond and react to their environment. Monarch butterflies are an example of how temperature can impact the survival and fitness of an organism. If exposed to stressors such as varying temperatures, these butterflies may express coloring that deviates from their normal color.

=== Lifestyle choices ===
Epigenetic marks can result from a number of exposures and choices made by an individual in their lifetime. Exposure to environmental pollutants, psychological stress, dietary choices or restrictions, working habits, and consumption of drugs or alcohol all influence the epigenetics of an individual and what may be passed down to future offspring. Such exposures can affect important processes of epigenetics such as DNA methylation and histone acetylation, influencing the risk for noncommunicable diseases such as obesity.

Physical Activity

Physical activity plays a pivotal role in shaping gene expression through key epigenetic mechanisms, including DNA methylation, histone modifications, and non-coding RNA activity. Regular exercise induces specific changes in DNA methylation patterns, particularly in genes related to metabolism, inflammation, and muscle adaptation, thereby regulating critical physiological pathways without altering the genetic code itself. For instance, both acute and long-term physical activity remodels promoter methylation in human skeletal muscle, improving glucose uptake, insulin sensitivity, and mitochondrial function.

Moreover, exercise promotes beneficial histone modifications, such as increased histone acetylation, which relaxes chromatin structure and facilitates the transcription of genes involved in muscle growth, endurance, and energy metabolism. Additionally, physical activity influences non-coding RNAs like microRNAs, modulating post-transcriptional gene regulation related to muscle repair, cardiovascular function, and immune response.

== Exposure ==
Exposure to certain materials or chemicals can cause an epigenetic reaction. The epigenetic causing substances cause issues like altered DNA methylation, CpG islands, chromatin, along with other transcription factors. Environmental epigenetics aims to relate such environmental triggers or substances to phenotypic variation. Numerous studies have demonstrated how exposure to environmental pollutants, such as heavy metals, pesticides, and air pollutants, can induce epigenetic changes in various organisms. For example, research has shown that exposure to pollutants like biphenol A (BPA) and polycyclic aromatic hydrocarbons (PAHs) can lead to DNA methylation changes and histone modifications in plants, animals, and humans.

Epigentic mechanisms play a role in the adaptation of species of changing environmental conditions, including climate change. Studies have shown that organisms can exhibit phenotypic plasticity through epigenetic modifications in response to environmental stressors such as temperature fluctuation, drought, and habitat loss.

Environmental epigenetics has revealed the potential for transgenerational effects, where environmental exposures experienced by one generation can influence the phenotypes and health outcomes of subsequent generations through epigenetic inheritance mechanisms. Studies in various organisms, including plants, insects, and mammals, have shown transgenerational epigenetic effects resulting from parental exposure to stressors such as toxins, dietary changes, and environmental contaminants. Epigenetic modifications can influence gene expression and phenotypic traits in organisms across different trophic levels, with implications for ecosystem stability.

=== Lemon sharks ===
A real-world example of environmental effects on DNA can be seen in lemon sharks (Negaprion brevirostris) in the Bahamas. After a dredging event, where machinery scrapes mud and debris from the ocean floor, these sharks were exposed to toxic metals like manganese and other pollutants. Scientists found that this pollution caused changes in the shark's DNA Methylation, a process that helps control gene activity. Essentially, the sharks' genes started behaving differently than normal, likely due to the stress of dredging and the toxins in their habitat. This case shows how human activities, like dredging, don't just harm the environment, but they can also trigger hidden changes in animals' DNA, potentially affecting their health and survival.

=== Plants ===
Plants require certain metals in small amounts for healthy growth, but excessive amounts can become toxic. While plants naturally absorb beneficial metals from soil, they can't distinguish these from harmful metals like mercury, so they take up both. When metal concentrations get too high, they damage plants in two main ways. First, they cause direct harm through oxidative stress, which creates destructive chemical reactions that damage plant cells. Second, they cause indirect harm by occupying spaces where plants normally absorb nutrients, blocking essential elements from entering the plant. The amount of mercury a plant absorbs depends on various factors including soil acidity and the specific plant species, making this a complex environmental issue.

Many types of heavy metals are toxic to plants, such as lead. Typically, land plants absorb lead(Pb) from the soil, most retaining it in their roots with some evidence of foliage uptakes and potential distribution to other plant parts. Calcium and phosphorus can reduce the uptake of lead, a common and toxic soil element that impacts the plant, growth structure, and photosynthesis of the plant. Lead, in particular, inhibits the process by which a plant grows from a seed into a seedling, known as seed germination in various species, by interfering with crucial enzymes. Studies have shown that lead acetate reduces protease and amylase activity in rice endosperm considerably. This interferes with early seeding growth across plant species such as soybean, rice, tomato, barley, maize, and some legumes.

Furthermore, lead delays root and steam elongation and leaf expansion, with the extent of root elongation inhibition varying based on the lead concentration, the medium's ionic composition, and pH. Soil levels that have high levels of lead can also cause irregular root thickening, cell wall modifications in peas, growth reduction in sugar beets, oxidative stress due to increased reactive oxygen species (ROS) production, biomass, and protein content in maize, along with diminished lead count and area, plant height in Portia trees, and enzyme activity affecting CO_{2} fixation in oats.

Manganese (Mn), is crucial for plants and involves in photosynthesis and other physiological processes. Deficiency commonly affects sandy, organic, or tropical soils with a high pH above six and heavily weathered tropical soils. Mn can move easily from roots to shoots, though it is not efficiently redistributed from leaves to other parts of the plant. The signs of Mn toxicity are necrotic brown spots on leaves, petioles, and steams that start on the lower leaves and move upward, leading to death. When damage to young leaves and stems, coupled with chlorosis and browning, called a "crinkle leaf." In some species, toxicity can begin with chlorosis in older leaves, advancing to younger ones, and can inhibit chlorophyll synthesis by interfering with iron-related processes. Mn toxicity is more present in soils with a pH level lower than six. In the broad bean plant, Mn affects shoot and root length The spearmint plant, lowers chlorophyll and carotenoid levels and increases root Mn accumulation. Pea plant, lowers chlorophyll a and b, growth rate, and photosynthesis. In the tomato plant, it slows growth and decreases chlorophyll concentration.

=== Humans ===
Humans have displayed evidence of epigenetic changes such as DNA methylation, differentiation in expression, and histone modification due to environmental exposures. Carcinogen development in humans has been studied in correlation to environmental inducements such as chemical and physical exposures and their transformative abilities on epigenetics. Chemical and physical environmental factors are contributors to epigenetic statuses amongst humans.

Firstly, a study was performed on drinking water populations in China involving three generations: the F1 generation consisting of grandparents exposed to arsenic in adulthood, the F2 generation including the parents exposed to arsenic in utero and early childhood, and the F3 generation which were the grandchildren exposed to arsenic from germ cells. This area in China was historically known for its dangerously high levels of arsenic, therefore, there was opportunity to examine the timeline As exposures across the three generations. The study was conducted to discover the linkage between the timeline effects of As exposure and DNA methylations. The population and environment for which the study was conducted were reportedly not exposed to other environmental exposures besides arsenic.

The results concluded from this experiment were that 744 CpG sites had been differentially methylated. The 744 sites were found across all three generations in the group exposed to arsenic. The concluding argument based on the results of this study is that the DNA methylation changes were more prevalent in those that developed arsenic-induced diseases.

Exposures to environmental factors during human lifetimes and their potential effect on phenotypes is a highly question topic involving epigenetics and disease development. In the case of humans, "unhealthy" phenotypes have been identified to carry such evidence that environmental epigenetics could be a leading cause in gene regulation, disease development, cell development and differentiation, aging, and carcinogenic effect. Although the way that environmental factors and the human genome work together is not completely understood, their influence has been identified and is continuing to drive explanations for human genome modifications and their outcomes. Driving evidence for adverse effects implemented by extrinsic factors from the environment, comes from studies done on nutrition and exposures to toxins.

Besides arsenic exposures, other metals have been identified to cause such hypermethylations. Concentrations of Cd, Cr, Cu, Pb and Zn metals were identified in fishermen's blood and resulted in an increase in the expression of the IGF2 gene. The IGF2 gene is responsible for making the insulin-like growth factor 2. The insulin-like growth factor is involved in growth and can result in disorders where cell growth and overgrowth are abnormal. Such disorders include breast and lung cancers and Silver–Russell and Beckwith–Wiedemann syndromes The significance of IGF2 gene expression is found in its relationships to human health. There is remaining uncertainty between the long-term environmental exposures and epigenetic changes, but conducted research has provided that heavy metal exposures cause DNA methylation changes.

Exposures to certain triggers such as alcohol or drugs can disrupt the normal expression of the offspring's phenotype. Antipsychotic drugs can lead to abnormal or stunted development during the fetal or embryonic stages.

== Multigenerational epigenetic inheritance ==
Organisms respond to the habitat around them in many different ways, one way is by changing its gene expression to one that is most suitable for their surroundings. More often than not, this has a direct correlation to phenotypic plasticity. Phenotypic plasticity is when a species develops new physical features in response to the environment they're in. Passing down epigenetics that are in relation to mitotic cell divisions allows for the belief of a possibility that this is also passed down from parents to offspring. Parents could be responsible for the development of new phenotypes in these cases.

=== Epigenetic inheritance ===
Epigenetic inheritance refers to passing down or transferring epigenetic information between the parent and offspring. Some believe that these occurrences can be passed down for many generations. For example, the language a given species utilizes develops a specific phenotype that will be passed down from generation to generation.

=== Cultural inheritance ===
Cultural inheritance is a behavioral factor that is passed down from generation to generation, similar to inheritance. For example, in rats, mothers that lick and groom their pups pass down a specific behavior to their offspring causing them to do the same to the subsequent generation. Epigenetic inheritance is involved in this, but they are separate things that work together.

=== Interplay between Epigenetic and Cultural inheritance ===
The interaction between epigenetic and cultural inheritance demonstrates how environmental factors can shape both biological and behavioral traits across generations. Epigenetic inheritance involves molecular mechanisms (e.g., DNA methylation, histone modifications) that regulate gene expression without altering the DNA sequence, while cultural inheritance consists of learned behaviors transmitted through social interactions. These processes can reinforce each other, leading to persistent phenotypic changes in offspring.

For example, in humans, parental trauma or nutritional deficits can induce epigenetic modifications that affect stress responses or metabolic functions in subsequent generations. These biological changes may then influence parenting behaviors, such as caregiving styles, which are further propagated through cultural transmission. Similarly, in animal models, maternal care behaviors (e.g., grooming in rats) have been linked to epigenetic alterations in offspring, affecting their stress reactivity and behavior as adults.

This relationship suggests that epigenetic and cultural inheritance are deeply intertwined, forming an integrated system of multigenerational adaptation. However, distinguishing between biologically inherited traits and culturally learned behaviors remains a challenge. Future research should explore how these mechanisms interact across different species and environments to better understand their evolutionary significance.

== Mechanisms influencing epigenetics ==
=== DNA replication ===
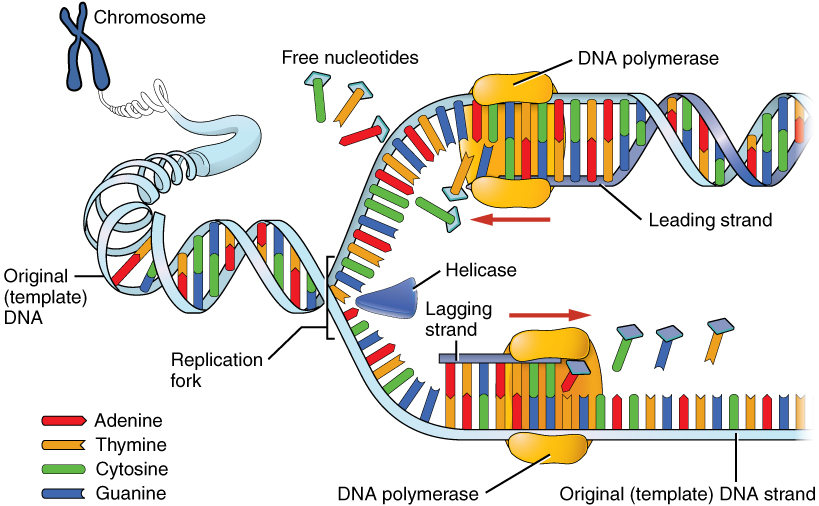
DNA Replication

DNA replication is a highly conserved process involving the copying of genetic information from parent one generation to the next. Within this complex process, chromatin disassembles and reassembles in a precise and regulated manner in order to compact large amounts of genetic material into the nucleus, while also maintaining the integrity of epigenetic information carried by histone proteins bound to DNA in the process of cell division. Half of the histones present during replication are from chromatin found in the parent DNA and thus carry the parent's epigenetic information. These epigenetic marks play a critical role in determining chromatin structure and thus gene expression in the newly synthesized DNA. The other half of the histones present in replication are newly synthesized.

=== DNA methylation ===
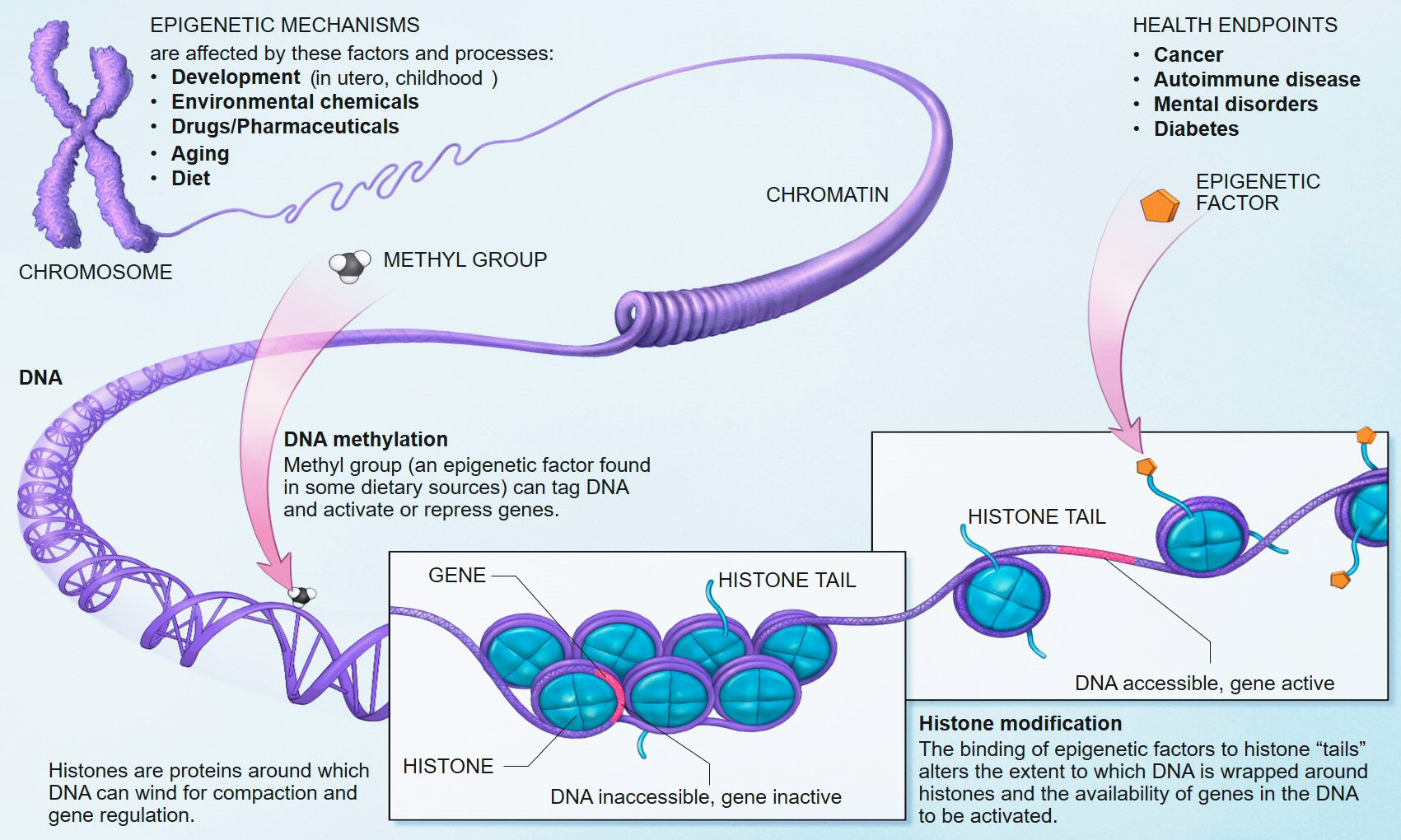
Epigenetic mechanisms-DNA methylation and acetylation

A major formative mechanism of epigenetic modification is DNA methylation. DNA methylation is the process of adding a methyl group to a cytosine base in the DNA strand, via covalent bond. This process is carried out by specific enzymes. These methyl additions can be reversed in a process known as demethylation. The presence or absence of methyl groups can attract proteins involved in gene repression, or inhibit the binding of certain transcription factors, thus preventing methylated genes from being transcribed, ultimately affecting phenotypic expression.

=== Acetylation ===
Acetylation is a reaction that introduces an acetyl group into an organic chemical compound, typically by substituting an acetyl group for a hydrogen atom. Deacetylation is the removal of an acetyl group from an organic chemical compound. Histone acetylation and deacetylation affect the three-dimensional structure of chromatin. A more relaxed chromatin structure leads to greater rates of genetic transcription, whereas a tighter structure inhibits transcription.

=== Transcriptional regulation ===
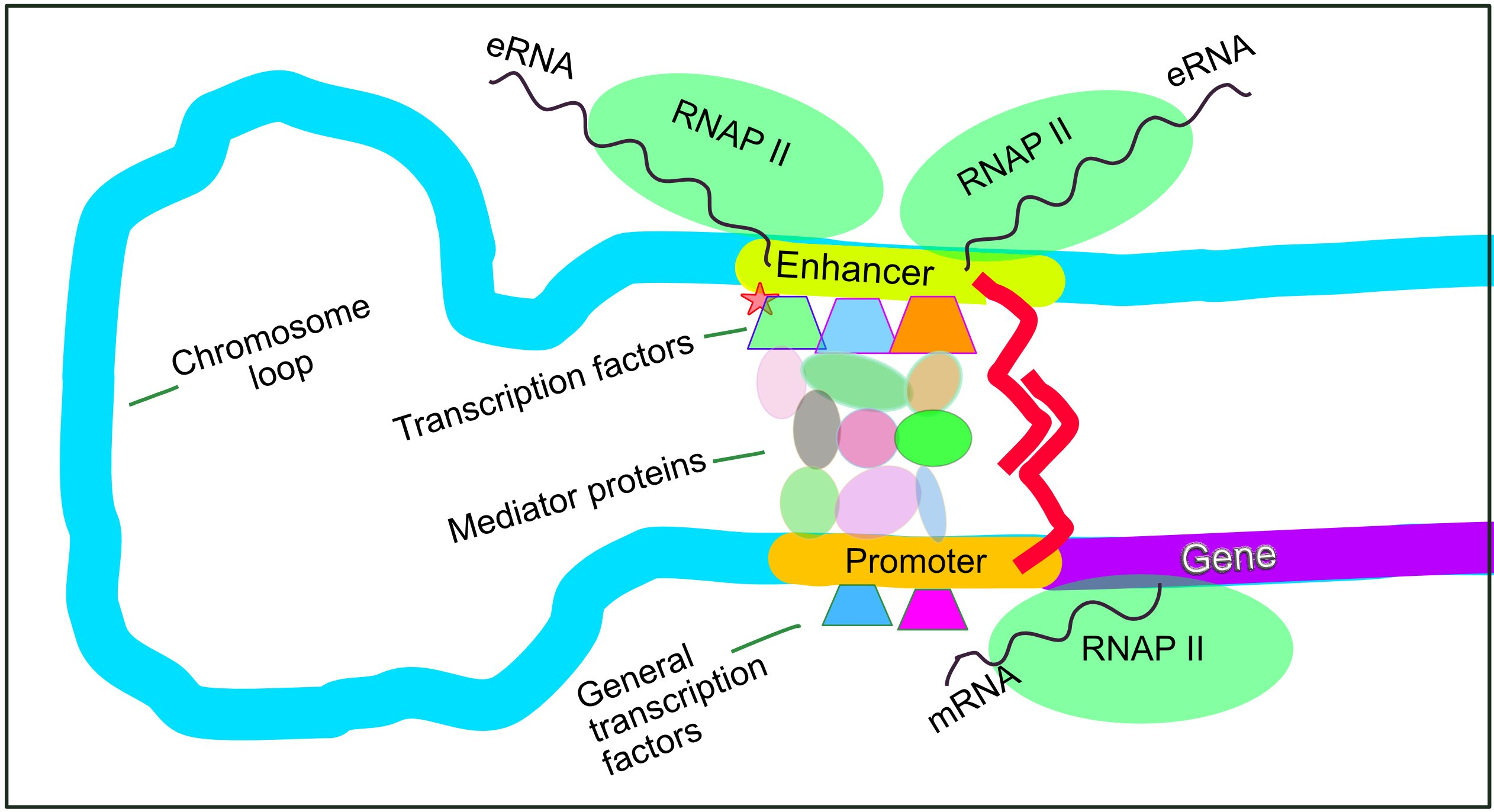
Regulation of transcription in mammals

Transcriptional regulation is a complex process involving the binding of transcriptional machinery to regulatory proteins—specifically chromatin remodeling or modifying proteins-directly onto a specific target. This may sometimes be facilitated by the contribution of accessory complexes that function primarily to repress and activate transcription in a cell. Transcriptional regulation additionally focuses on the epigenetic regulation of a target locus, as the epigenetic status of the locus determines either the facilitation of or prohibition of transcription. Epigenetic regulation is necessary for the precise deployment of transcriptional programs.
