= Jesper Q. Svejstrup =

Danish molecular biologist and biochemist (born 1963)

Jesper Qualmann Svejstrup (born March 28, 1963) is a Danish molecular biologist and biochemist, known for his study of gene transcription and its intricate relationship with DNA-related processes including DNA repair, replication, and recombination.

== Early life and education ==
Svejstrup was born on March 28, 1963, in Aarhus, Denmark, to parents who worked as building engineers. Following the completion of his secondary education, Svejstrup attended Aarhus University where he earned a degree in biology in 1989. He then continued his studies at the same institution, earning his PhD in molecular biology.

== Research and career ==
During his doctoral studies, Svejstrup conducted research on the molecular mechanism of DNA Topoisomerases, which are enzymes that help eliminate overwinding or underwinding of DNA. His investigations led him to the discovery of 'suicide substrates' for DNA topoisomerase I and the realization that the anti-tumor drug camptothecin blocks the enzyme's re-ligation reaction.

Svejstrup currently holds the position of a professor and Deputy Chairman (Research) at the Department of Cellular and Molecular Medicine at the University of Copenhagen. He is also a Visiting Scientist at the Francis Crick Institute in London. Additionally, Svejstrup holds the positions of Honorary Professor at University College London and Imperial College London, and Honorary Skou Professor at Aarhus University.

Svejstrup's research group specializes in studying the fundamental mechanisms of RNA polymerase II transcription. His research aims to unlock a deeper understanding of the complex interactions between transcription factors, DNA, and RNA polymerase II, and how these interactions can impact the stability of the genome.

== Awards and honors ==
Svejstrup has been appointed as a Fellow of the Royal Society in 2009. In 2016, he was elected a Member of the Royal Danish Academy of Sciences and Letters, and in 2018, he was elected as a Fellow of the Academy of Medical Sciences (United Kingdom). Svejstrup was elected a member of EMBO in 2003, and in 2024 he received the Carlsberg Foundation's Research Prize.

From 2023 to 2025, he served as Vice-President of the European Research Council, overseeing its Life Sciences domain, having been a member of the ERC Scientific Council since 2019.
