= Andrea Gore =

Scientist

- Education: Princeton University (BA) University of Wisconsin-Madison (PhD)
- Occupation: Neuroendocrinology Professor
- Employer: University of Texas at Austin

Andrea C. Gore is a neuroendocrinology professor at the University of Texas at Austin in the Division of Toxicology and Pharmacology, where she holds the Vacek Chair of Pharmacology. She is a prominent contributor to the field of reproductive endocrinology. Her research interests span from the neurological basis of reproductive aging to endocrine disruptors in the nervous system. From January 2013 through December 2017, she was Editor-in-Chief of the journal Endocrinology. She has also been elected into the Fellow to the American Association for the Advancement of Science.

== Education ==
Gore graduated cum laude from Princeton University in 1985 with a A.B. in Biology. She received her Ph.D. in neuroscience from University of Wisconsin-Madison in 1990. For her Ph.D. she studied hormonal control of puberty onset in rhesus monkeys. From 1991 to 1995, she completed a postdoctoral fellowship in Molecular Medicine at Mount Sinai School of Medicine.

== Career ==
After her postdoctoral fellowship, she became an assistant professor in Neurobiology at Mount Sinai School of Medicine. In 2002, she became an associate professor at Mount Sinai. Beginning in 2008, Gore has served as a Gustavus & Louise Pfeiffer Professor Professor of Pharmacology at University of Texas at Austin. Throughout her career, Gore has been dedicated to increasing representation of women in science by mentoring female students and advocating against biases regarding women's innate abilities for math and science. The Senate of College Councils honored her mentorship of women with the Edith Clarke Woman of Excellence Award.

== Research ==
Gore has authored or co-authored four books and published over 170 peer-reviewed articles. Her current research focuses on the effects of endocrine disrupting chemicals from the environment on hypothalamus development which can alter psychological and social outcomes as well as generational effects in children and adults. Her lab is also focused on the effects of estrogen levels and supplementation on menopause onset timing and neurological changes related to aging and menopause.

== Awards ==
Visionary Environmental Health Research (RIVER) (R35) Grant Award, National Institute of Environmental Health Sciences (NIEHS) Revolutionizing Innovative (2023)

Civitatis Award, The University of Texas at Austin (2019)

Endocrine Society Laureate Award, Outstanding Public Service Award (2016)

Edith Clarke Woman of Excellence Award by the Senate of College Councils (2016)

Distinguished Scientist Award, Society for Experimental Biology and Medicine (2013)

Top 100 Science Stories of 2007 of Discover Magazine (2007)

Women in Endocrinology, Janet W. McArthur Achievement Award (1996)
