= Edelmann =

Edelmann (German for "nobleman") is a surname. Notable people with the surname include:

- Heinz Edelmann (1934–2009), German illustrator and designer
- Jean-Frédéric Edelmann (1749–1794), French classical composer
- Otto Edelmann (1917–2003), Austrian singer
- Samuli Edelmann (born 1968), Finnish actor and singer
- Tino Edelmann (born 1985), German Nordic combined skier

== See also ==
- Edelman
- Adelmann
