= Athira Pharma =

Athira Pharma Inc.
- Traded as: Nasdaq: ATHA
- Industry: Biotechnology, Pharmaceuticals
- Founded: 2011
- Headquarters: Seattle, United States
- Products: ATH-1017
- Website: www.athira.com

Athira Pharma is a late clinical stage American biopharmaceutical company developing small-molecule therapeutics targeting neurodegenerative diseases such as Alzheimer's disease and Parkinson's disease. The company's lead candidate, ATH-1017, is in human studies for Alzheimer's disease as of 2021.

The company was founded in 2011 and is headquartered in Seattle. Funding that supports the company is from both public and private investment groups including the Alzheimer's Drug Discovery Foundation, Dolby Family Ventures, the State of Washington's Life Sciences Discovery Fund, The W Fund, WRF Capital, and other private investors.

Leen Kawas served as the company's first President and CEO, but resigned in October 2021, after an independent special committee found she "altered images in scientific papers she authored." In 2025, the company paid a $4 million settlement in relation to allegations that the CEO falsified research to secure a federal grant. On October 21, 2021, Mark Litton, Ph.D., M.B.A. became chief executive officer.

== History ==
The company has completed four rounds of venture funding. Athira Pharma was known as M3 Biotechnology until it underwent a name change on April 11, 2019.

== Core technology ==
The company's lead asset, ATH-1017, is in human trials of Alzheimer's disease as of 2021. According to the company, ATH-1017 targets the hepatocyte growth factor (HGF) and MET receptor pathways, which are involved in central nervous system function. ATH-1017 is currently being tested in two clinical studies: ACT-AD and LIFT-AD.
