= J. Murray Luck =

Canadian biochemist

James Murray Luck
- Born: October 23, 1899; Paris, Ontario, Canada
- Died: August 26, 1993 (aged 93); Menlo Park, California, US
- Citizenship: American
- Education: University of Toronto; University of Cambridge
- Known for: Founding Annual Reviews
- Spouse: Eroeda Nicholaevna Sinitskaya Luck (m. 1947)
- Children: 2
- Scientific career
- Fields: Biochemistry
- Workplaces: Stanford University
- Notable students: Paul D. Boyer, Nobel laureate

James Murray Luck (October 23, 1899 – August 26, 1993) was a Canadian biochemist. At the time of his death in 1993, he was the longest-serving faculty in the history of Stanford University, getting hired in 1926 as an assistant professor and retiring in 1965. Luck authored more than 200 scientific publications, and mentored the future Nobel laureate Paul D. Boyer. While at Stanford, he started the academic journal Annual Review of Biochemistry, first published in 1932. After adding a second title in physiology, the advisory committee of the journal changed its name to Annual Reviews, which publishes fifty-one journals as of 2021.

Luck served as a science attaché, spending two years at the US Embassy in Bern, Switzerland, and two months each at the embassies in London and Stockholm. He took an interest in cooperative organization, helping establish the Palo Alto Co-op, which were consumer-owned grocery stores. He also cofounded the Palo Alto Credit Union (cooperative banking) and the Peninsula Housing Association (cooperative housing).

== Early life and education ==
James Murray Luck was born in Paris, Ontario on October 23, 1899 as the youngest of five children to his parents, Nina Victoria Coulson and Horatio Washington Luck. In 1922, he graduated with a bachelor of science degree from University of Toronto, which was followed by a PhD in biochemistry from University of Cambridge in 1925. While at Cambridge, he studied the origin of ammonia in the bloodstream with Frederick Gowland Hopkins and J. B. S. Haldane.

== Career ==
=== Research and academic societies ===
After graduating from Cambridge, Luck returned to the University of Toronto and worked for a year as a "Demonstrator" in biochemistry. In 1926, Luck began teaching biochemistry as an assistant professor at Stanford University. In 1934, he was made an associate professor, and in 1941 a full professor. He retired in 1965, making him the longest-serving faculty member at Stanford. In the course of his career, he authored more than 200 scientific publications. One of the graduate students he mentored, Paul D. Boyer, won the Nobel Prize in Chemistry in 1997.

He served as Secretary of the American Association for the Advancement of Science—Pacific Division from 1929–1944, and served as president by 1957. He was also a member of various committees for the American Cancer Society, National Institutes of Health, the Medical Fellowship Board, the National Research Council, and National Science Foundation. For several years, he was head of the International Union of Pure and Applied Chemistry's Section on Biological Chemistry.

Luck was the namesake of the James Murray Luck Award for Excellence in Scientific Reviewing, which was created in 1979 by the National Academy of Sciences.

=== Annual Reviews ===
Luck was the founder of Annual Review of Biochemistry, which published its first issue in 1932. Luck decided to offer a course on current research in biochemistry to graduate students. In designing the course, he said he felt "knee-deep in trouble", as he only felt sufficiently knowledgeable about a few areas of biochemistry relative to the graduate students. Additionally, the volume of current research was overwhelming, with 6,500 abstracts regarding biochemistry published in Chemical Abstracts in 1930. In July 1930, Luck wrote to about 50 biochemists in the US, United Kingdom, and Canada to ask if an annual volume of critical reviews on biochemistry research would be useful, to which he received positive responses. His correspondence suggested possible authors and topics for his first several volumes. Stanford University Press agreed to publish the journal on a three-year contract, with financial assistance from the Chemical Foundation. Prior to this, Luck's only experience in the publishing industry was working for a summer as a book salesman in Western Canada. Volume I was published in July 1932, consisting of thirty reviews from thirty-five authors of nine different countries; the volume was 724 pages.

At the completion of the contract with Stanford University Press, the Advisory Committee of the journal, which included Carl L. Alsberg, Denis Hoagland, and Carl L. A. Schmidt, decided to assume a legal identity as the journal's publisher, though keeping Stanford University Press as the printer. On December 12, 1934, they submitted articles of incorporation with the California Secretary of State to create Annual Review of Biochemistry, Ltd., which was organized as a nonprofit. In February 1938, the name was changed to Annual Reviews, Inc. In 1938, Annual Reviews and the American Physiological Society agreed to collaborate to create a new journal, with the first volume of Annual Review of Physiology published in 1939. A third journal, Annual Review of Microbiology, was created in 1947. Luck participated in administrative work for Annual Reviews until his retirement from the Editor-in-Chief position in 1967 or 1968. At the time of his retirement, Annual Reviews had thirteen titles.

=== Diplomacy ===
In 1962, he was made the science attaché of the US Embassy in Bern, Switzerland. He served for two years, saying he "fell completely in love with Switzerland", authoring three books related to this history of science in Switzerland: Science in Switzerland (1965), Modern Switzerland, and History of Switzerland: The First Hundred Thousand Years; From Before the Beginnings to the Days of the Present (1985).

He served at the US Embassy in London for a period of two months in 1967, and for another two months as acting science attaché at the embassy in Stockholm.

=== Other interests ===
Luck had an interest in nutrition science, and conducted a local survey each year on the cost of a balanced diet from the 1950s to the 1960s. Luck published his first book in 1945, The War on Malnutrition and Poverty: The Role of the Consumer Cooperatives.

As President of the Pacific Division of American Association for the Advancement of Science, Luck gave a speech in regards to human population growth, saying that abortion should be permitted and encouraged in some cases, which proved highly controversial. In its obituary of him, the New York Times called Luck "an early advocate of abortion as a means of worldwide population control".

== Personal life and death ==
Luck was married to Eroeda Nicholaevna Sinitskaya Luck in 1947; they had a son and daughter together. He was one of the founders of the Palo Alto Co-op, which became consumer-owned grocery stores, the Palo Alto Credit Union, and the Peninsula Housing Association, a housing cooperative.

Luck died of cardiac failure on August 26, 1993, at his home in Menlo Park, California. He was 93.
