= Kenneth Walsh (medical researcher) =

American medical researcher

- Education: University of California, Berkeley
- Scientific career
- Fields: Cardiovascular medicine Cardiovascular biology
- Workplaces: University of Virginia School of Medicine; Boston University School of Medicine; Tufts University
- Thesis: Regulation of flux through metabolic cycles (1984)
- Notable students: David Gorski
- Website: www.kwalshlab.org

Kenneth Walsh is an American medical researcher specializing in the study of cardiovascular medicine. He is a professor of medicine at the University of Virginia School of Medicine. He was formerly a professor at Tufts University. Along with Mark T. Nelson, he succeeded David Julius in 2021 as the co-editor of the peer-reviewed journal the Annual Review of Physiology.

== Honors and awards ==
Walsh has received an Established Investigator Award from the American Heart Association and the Irwin F. Page Investigator Award from the Council on Arteriosclerosis. In 2011, he was one of five researchers named as Distinguished Scientists that year by the American Heart Association.
