= Jay S. Rosenblatt =

American psychologist (1923–2014)

- Born: Jay Seth Rosenblatt; November 18, 1923; East Bronx, New York City New York, United States
- Died: February 16, 2014 (aged 90); New York City, New York, United States
- Education: New York University
- Known for: Animal behavior, maternal behavior, reproductive behavior, clinical psychology and psychoanalysis
- Awards: Fellow of the American Association for the Advancement of Science; (2006) Daniel S. Lehrman Lifetime Achievement Award from the Society for Behavioral Neuroendocrinology; (2007) Senior Investigator Award from the International Society for Developmental Psychobiology
- Scientific career
- Fields: Psychology, animal behavior
- Workplaces: Rutgers University-Newark
- Doctoral advisor: Lester Aronson, T. C. Schneirla

Jay Seth Rosenblatt (November 18, 1923 – February 16, 2014) held the position of emeritus professor of psychology at Rutgers University-Newark. At the time of his retirement in 2005, he was the Daniel S. Lehrman Professor of Psychobiology. He was a scientist, psychotherapist and painter. His scientific research largely established the study of neonate learning and especially mother-offspring behavior throughout the maternal cycle. For the latter work, he was known in developmental psychobiology as the "father of mothering". He received several honors and awards during his career, including election to the American Association for the Advancement of Science.

== Biography ==
=== Personal ===
Rosenblatt was born in the East Bronx, which is part of New York City, New York, the youngest of three children. His mother, a housewife, immigrated from Russia to flee from the pogroms of the early 20th century; his father, a furrier, arrived from Austria as a teenager.

In high school, the Works Progress Administration allowed him to study art and especially painting. During World War II he was a camouflage artist and he continued to paint the rest of his life. He married Gilda Rosenblatt (née Rosen) who died in 1999. He then married Pat Rosenblatt. He had two children Daniel and Nina.

=== Academic ===
In 1946, after the army, Rosenblatt entered New York University. There he met T. C. Schneirla who influenced the direction his scientific interests and research would take. Schneirla convinced Rosenblatt that the study of animal behavior would broaden his understanding of human behavior and that it was interesting in itself. He began his research on the role of hormones and experience on the sexual behavior of male cats. Supported by Schneirla, he began his doctoral work in 1958 at the American Museum of Natural History study of early learning in kittens. He discovered that kittens could orient to home by 3 to 4 days of age and that they formed nipple attachment preferences by 1 to 2 days of age. This was contrary to learning paradigms of that time, which assumed that animals could not learn at very young ages. In the 1950s, while an assistant professor at the City College of New York, he became a person of interest for the House Un-American Activities Committee, which was conveyed to the City College of New York. Subsequently, his contract was not renewed he went to Rutgers University at Newark where he joined the Institute of Animal Behavior the Institute of Animal Behavior founded by Daniel S. Lehrman who he had been friends with during graduate school.

In 1972, he became director of the Institute of Animal Behavior at Rutgers University-Campus at Newark by unanimous vote after the death it founder Daniel S. Lehrman and remained its director for more than 17 years. He served as dean of the Graduate School of Rutgers University-Newark. He also served as editor for Advance in the Study of Behavior for more than 10 years. In 2005, he retired as Daniel S. Lehrman Professor of Psychobiology. After his retirement, he continued to work at the Rutgers University-Campus at Newark until 2012.

He was viewed as a successful mentor by those who knew him:

Jay was a wonderful, warm, sensitive, caring, patient mentor, and role model to young investigators, post- docs, graduate students, and undergraduates. His was a steady, dependable, guiding helpful hand to all. He had a profound impact on launching the academic research careers of many young women and men.

— from Jay S. Rosenblatt, Ph.D., 1924–2014, p. 1165

== Painter ==
"Mother and older Child" a painting by Jay S. Rosenblatt

As a teenager, Rosenblatt apprenticed in the studio of Ben Wilson under the Works in Progress Administration. Wilson had a major impact on him, Rosenblatt would later say of Wilson "I saw that he was thoughtful and deeply sincere in his work and that he would be supportive of my becoming a painter." He would keep in contact with Wilson for 63 years until Wilson died in 2005. Rosenblatt's painting was influenced not only by Wilson but also by painters such as Georges Braque, Paul Cézanne, and Pablo Picasso. The content of his paintings was influenced by Judaism and Marxism. Many of his paintings were political focusing on war and The Holocaust. Another major theme of his paintings were of mothers and their children, which would mirror his scientific interest in maternal behavior as a scientist. For example, in his painting "Mother and older Child," both of his subjective and scientific perspectives of mother-child relationships are expressed, evoking both discomfort and comfort in the viewer. He never became a professional painter, but Rutgers University held a show in the late 1990s for 56 of his paintings.

== Psychoanalysis and clinical psychologist ==
Rosenblatt met psychoanalyst Max Hertzman while he was a teaching assistant at City College of New York. He was interested in psychoanalysis because he wanted to understand better "intrapsychic events" in himself and his clients. He also wanted to find out if psychology as he understood it could be applied to real people, which led him to take a job at the Pediatric Psychiatry Clinic at Brooklyn Jewish Hospital. There he diagnosed children with emotional and psychological disorders. He discovered that his formal training in psychology helped him to understand the children he diagnosed.

== Scientist ==
Rosenblatt's research in developmental psychobiology focused on early neonate learning and maternal behavior. It explored these processes using multiple levels of analysis, using multiple techniques, and from multiple perspectives (i.e., proximal, functional, comparative, and evolutionary).

=== Neonate learning ===
In the 1960s, Rosenblatt experimentally demonstrated that learning in newly born animals occurred earlier than had been thought possible (see Rosenblatt, Turkewitz, and Schneirla, 1969). His early work with kittens showed that early learning in neonates initially involved single sensory modalities such as tactile, thermal, and olfactory sensory modalities. As development proceeded these sensory modalities are integrated and learning becomes multimodal. His early work with kittens demonstrated these developmental processes of early learning and set the stage for a new field of research that focuses on neonatal learning in naturalistic contexts (see Rosenblatt, 1971; Rosenblatt, Turkewitz, and Schneirla, 1969).

The discovery of early learning in neonates was, according to Rosenblatt, serendipitous. It occurred while he was studying cats in the 1950s and when he was weighing kittens on a daily basis. He noticed that when he returned the kittens to their home environment (without their mother present), they returned to their home corner faster and faster each day. The kittens' eyes had not yet opened during this time and so they were blind to any visual stimuli. The only way they could find the corner they had been in is by learning the olfactory characteristics of that area in their home environment where they had been nursed (see Rosenblatt, 1983; Rosenblatt, Turkewitz, and Schneirla, 1969).

=== Maternal behavior ===
He did his seminal work on maternal behavior during the late 1960s through the 1970s. This work consisted of two major themes: behavioral transitions in maternal cyclic patterns of behavior and the coupling of mother-offspring behavior during these maternal cycles (Rosenblatt, 1970). His work on maternal behavior, starting in the 1960s, focused primarily on the rat as an animal model. He identified three important phases in maternal cyclic patterns of behavior: the first phase spans conception through most of pregnancy, the second begins towards the end of pregnancy and continues through birth, and the third is the maintenance phase, which extends from the postpartum phase to weaning. He began his research by describing the phenomena associated with each of these phases of the mother-offspring cyclic patterns of behavior. His studies also determined the role of sensory factors in mother and offspring behavior. He investigated physiological, hormonal, and affective mechanisms and their feedback in maternal and offspring cyclic patterns of behavior (Rosenblatt, 1980). It is because of Rosenblatt's early study of maternal behavior, the coupling of mother-offspring behavior, and his conceptualization of these behavioral processes as occurring in phases that he is often called "father of mothering" or "father of maternal behavior" within the field of psychobiology.

Rosenblatt's 1967 study of the induction of maternal behavior is considered by many in his field to be his most famous study. In that study he showed that the neural basis of parental care is independent of pregnancy and birth. He found that he could induce maternal behavior in virgin female rats during a 6 to 8 day period by continuously exposing them to rat pups. He also found that female rats that were ovariectomized or hypophysectomized could also be induced to exhibit maternal behavior via the continuous exposure to rat pups. Although the hormonal and physiological processes that occur during pregnancy and birth enhance maternal behavior, maternal behavior has an already developed neural basis in the brain.

== Honors and awards ==
He received several honors and awards during his career. In 1971, he was elected as a fellow of the Animal Behavior Society. In 2004, he was elected as a fellow of the American Association for the Advancement of Science. In 1986, a volume of the Annals of the New York Academy of Sciences was published in honor of Jay S. Rosenblatt for his contributions to the field of animal behavior. In 1987, he received a Doctorate honoris causa from the University of Gothenburg and, in 1997, he received a Doctorate honoris causa from the National University of Distance Education.

== Selected bibliography ==
During his career, Rosenblatt published over 160 articles and chapters.

- Rosenblatt, Jay S.; Aronson, L.R. (1958). "The influence of experience on behavioural effects of androgen in prepuberally castrated male cats". Animal Behaviour. 6 (3–4): 171–182. doi:10.1016/0003-3472(58)90048-4.
- Rosenblatt, Jay S.; Lehrman, D. S. (1963). "Maternal behavior in the laboratory rat". In Rheingold, H. L. (ed.). Maternal Behavior in Mammals. New York: John Wiley & Sons. pp. 8–57.
- Rosenblatt, Jay S. (1967). "Nonhormonal Basis of Maternal Behavior in the Rat". Science. 156 (2781): 1512–1513. doi:10.1126/science.156.3781.1512. PMID 5611028. S2CID 33076382.
- Rosenblatt, Jay S.; Turkewitz, Gerald; Schneirla, T. C. (1969). "Development of Home Orientation in newly born Kittens". Transactions of the New York Academy of Sciences. 31 (3 Series II): 231–250. doi:10.1111/j.2164-0947.1969.tb02903.x. PMID 5252214.
- Rosenblatt, Jay S. (1970). "Views on the onset and maintenance of maternal behavior in the rat". In Aronson, L.; Tobach, E.; Rosenblatt, J. S.; Lehrman, D. S. (eds.). Development and Evolution of Behavior: Essays in Memory of T. C. Schneirla. San Francisco: Freeman. pp. 489–515.
- Rosenblatt, Jay S. (1971). "Suckling and home orientation in the kitten: A comparative developmental study". In Tobach, E.; Aronson, L.; Shaw, E. (eds.). The Biopsychology of Development. New York: Academic Press. pp. 345–410.
- Rosenblatt, Jay S. (1975). "Selective retrieving by maternal and nonmaternal female rats". Journal of Comparative and Physiological Psychology. 88 (2): 678–86. doi:10.1037/h0076410. PMID 1167224.
- Rosenblatt, Jay S. (1980). "Hormonal and nonhormonal regulation of maternal behavior : A theoretical survey". Reproduction, Nutrition, Development. 20 (3B): 791–800. doi:10.1051/rnd:19800505. PMID 6818633.
- Rosenblatt, Jay S. (1983). "Olfaction mediates developmental transition in the altricial newborn of selected species of mammals". Developmental Psychobiology. 16 (5): 347–375. doi:10.1002/dev.420160502. PMID 6618012.
- Rosenblatt, Jay S. (1989). "The physiological and evolutionary background of maternal responsiveness". New Directions for Child and Adolescent Development. 1989 (43): 15–30. doi:10.1002/cd.23219894304. PMID 2651997.
- Rosenblatt, Jay S. (2003). "Outline of the evolution of behavioral and nonbehavioral patterns of parental care among the vertebrates: critical characteristics of mammalian and avian parental behavior". Scandinavian Journal of Psychology. 44 (3): 265–271. doi:10.1111/1467-9450.00344. PMID 12914590.
- Rosenblatt, Jay S. (2007). "Gilbert Gottlieb: Intermediator between psychology and evolutionary biology". Developmental Psychobiology. 49 (8): 800–807. doi:10.1002/dev.20271. PMID 18022998. S2CID 41605115.
