= David E. Adelman =

American lawyer and academic

David E. Adelman is an American lawyer and academic. He currently serves as the Harry Reasoner Regents Chair at the University of Texas School of Law.
