= Regis B. Kelly =

British neuroscientist and academic

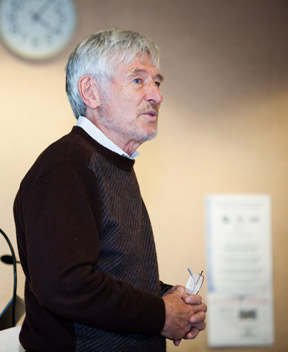
Regis Kelly at QB3 in April 2011. Photo: Elisabeth Fall

Regis Baker Kelly OBE is a neuroscientist and university administrator who develops academia-industry partnerships and supports early-stage entrepreneurship in the life sciences.

== Early life ==
Kelly grew up in a working-class family in Edinburgh, Scotland. He graduated from the University of Edinburgh with a bachelor's degree in physics in 1961.

Kelly earned a doctorate in biophysics at the California Institute of Technology in 1967. He went on to pursue postdoctoral studies under Nobel Laureate Arthur Kornberg at Stanford University, examining mechanisms of DNA replication. He switched fields to neurobiology during a second postdoctoral fellowship under the direction of Zach Hall at Harvard University.

== Career ==
Kelly joined the University of California, San Francisco (UCSF) in 1971. He began as an assistant professor in the Department of Biochemistry and Biophysics. His neurobiology research explored biochemical mechanisms of synaptic transmission and neural plasticity involved in long-term memory.

While at UCSF Kelly was appointed chair of the Department of Biochemistry and Biophysics (1995–2000), director of the graduate program in Cell Biology (1988–1995) and director of the Hormone Research Institute (1992–2000).

During this time he served on the editorial boards of scientific journals, including Cell, The Journal of Cell Biology, The Journal of Membrane Biology, Trends in Neurosciences, and Traffic. He also served on the national committee for the Council of American Society for Cell Biology from 1989 to 1992.

In 2000 Kelly was appointed executive vice-chancellor of UCSF. As chancellor he directed the construction of the new UCSF Mission Bay Campus and oversaw the UCSF research enterprise.

In 2004 Kelly retired as executive vice-chancellor and took the position of director of the California Institute for Quantitative Biosciences (QB3), one of the four Governor Gray Davis Institutes for Science and Innovation.

As director Kelly's stated goal is to promote academic research as a means to improve public health and drive economic growth. To accomplish this he bridges academia with commercial industries and entrepreneurship ventures.

In addition Kelly, with QB3's associate director Douglas Crawford, created the first startup incubator at the University of California—the QB3 Garage, which has expanded into a network of five incubators hosting over 40 companies. Under Kelly's direction QB3 has initiated Bridging-the-Gap Awards and the Start-up-In-A-Box Program to fund translational research and provide resources for start-up ventures with the potential for commercialisation.

Kelly was appointed an Officer of the Order of the British Empire (OBE) in the 2014 New Year Honours for services to science, innovation, and global health.

== Awards ==
- 1986, 1992 Jacob Javitz Memorial Award, National Institutes of Health
- 1995–2000 Albert Bowers Chair
- 1998–2000 Johnson & Johnson Focused Giving Program Award
- 2011 San Francisco Bay Area Business Hall of Fame
- 2015 Byers Family Distinguished Professorship, UCSF
