= Daniel S. Lehrman =

Daniel S. Lehrman (June 1, 1919 – August 27, 1972) was an American naturalist, animal psychologist, ornithologist and comparative psychologist.

== Notability ==
Lehrman was notable for his contributions to the study of animal behavior, studies of the reproductive cycle of the ring doves, behavioral endocrinology and an influential educator. The National Academies of Science said that Lehrman "influenced a whole generation of students in animal behavior in this country and abroad".

== Membership ==
Lehrman was a member of the National Academy of Sciences, the founder and director (until his death in 1972) of the Institute of Animal Behavior at Rutgers University, a fellow of the American Academy of Arts and Sciences, a founder of Society for Behavioral Neuroendocrinology, a member of the Society of Experimental Psychologists, a founder of a series Advances in the Study of Behavior and its editor until his death, and a recipient of Research Career Award from the National Institute of Mental Health.
