= Richard B. Gallagher =

Scottish immunologist

Richard Gallagher
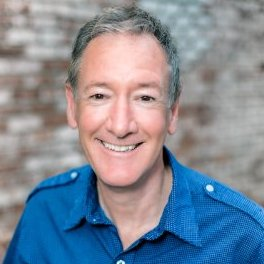
- Citizenship: United Kingdom
- Education: University of Glasgow (B.S., PhD)
- Scientific career
- Fields: Immunology
- Workplaces: Trinity College Dublin (1986–1989); Elsevier (1989–1992); Science International (1992–1999); Nature Research (1999–2002); The Scientist (2002–2010); Annual Reviews (2015–present)
- Thesis: Studies on cell adhesion in relation to immune responses
- Doctoral advisor: Adam S. G. Curtis

Richard Barclay Gallagher is a Scottish immunologist, science editor, and academic publisher. He is the president and editor-in-chief of Annual Reviews. He graduated with a doctoral degree from the University of Glasgow and was a researcher at Trinity College Dublin before he began working in academic publishing in 1989, holding positions with Elsevier and the journals Science and Nature. In the 2000s, he was the editor of the magazine The Scientist.

In 2015, Gallagher became president and editor-in-chief of Annual Reviews, where he oversaw its expansion into new journal titles, developed the Subscribe to Open initiative for open access publishing, launched the online magazines Knowable Magazine, Knowable en español and Katina Magazine, and expanded support for research communities by acquiring the Charleston Conference, Knowledge Unlatched and Underline Science. In 2025, Gallagher was awarded the Association of Learned and Professional Society Publishers' ALPSP Award for Contribution to Scholarly Publishing.

== Education ==
Richard Barclay Gallagher received a Bachelor of Science in immunology from the University of Glasgow in 1981. He earned a PhD in cell biology, also at the University of Glasgow, in 1985 under the advisorship of Adam S. G. Curtis. While a PhD student, he joined the British Society for Immunology. He was later a postdoctoral fellow at University College Dublin, where he researched sarcoidosis.

== Career ==
From 1986 to 1989, Richard Gallagher worked as the Wellcome Trust Lecturer in Immunology at Trinity College Dublin. In 1989, he left academic research and began a career in publishing, becoming editor of the magazine Immunology Today, published by Elsevier, until 1992. From 1992 to 1999, he was office head and senior editor of the Europe Office of the journal Science. He was the chief biology editor at the journal Nature from 1999 to 2001, during which time he managed the publication of the papers reporting the sequencing of the human genome, and served as the publisher of Nature from 2001 to 2002.

In 2002, he was hired as editor of the magazine The Scientist ; he additionally became its publisher in 2004. During his tenure, he shifted the format from biweekly to monthly; its style changed from a "quirky tabloid" to a "stylish and engaging magazine". He published monthly editorials about topics such as vaccines, the longevity of punishment for scientific misconduct, and whether or not intelligent design should be taught in public schools. He worked at The Scientist for eight years, leaving in 2010.

In 2015, he became editor-in-chief and president of Annual Reviews, succeeding Samuel Gubins. He also serves on the Board of Directors of Annual Reviews. While at Annual Reviews, he developed the Subscribe to Open initiative for open access publishing, to remove paywalls from its review journals. Several new journal titles were added to Annual Reviews after his tenure began, including in cancer biology; biomedical data science; control, robotics, and autonomous systems; criminology; and developmental psychology.

In 2017 Gallagher expanded from scholarly publishing into science journalism and science communication, by developing and launching the online magazine Knowable Magazine to present the real-world significance of scholarly work to a general audience, In 2022, Knowable was followed by a Spanish-language sister publication, Knowable en español. In 2024, Katina Magazine was launched for the library community.

Under Gallagher's leadership, Annual Reviews has supported research communities through the acquisition of the Charleston Hub for academic libraries, librarians, and publishers; the open access (OA) initiative Knowledge Unlatched; and the event technology provider Underline Science.

== Works ==
- Gallagher, Richard, ed. (1991). HIV and the Immune System. Elsevier Trends Journals. ISBN 978-1851665648.
- Gallagher, Richard; Gilder, Jean; Nossal, Gustav; Salvatore, Gaetano, eds. (1995). Immunology: The Making of a Modern Science. Academic Press. ISBN 9780122740206.
- Dennis, Carina; Gallagher, Richard B. (2001). The Human Genome. Nature/Palgrave. ISBN 9780333971437.

== Awards ==
- 2025, ALPSP Award for Contribution to Scholarly Publishing, Association of Learned and Professional Society Publishers
