= Temple University Press =

University press in the United States

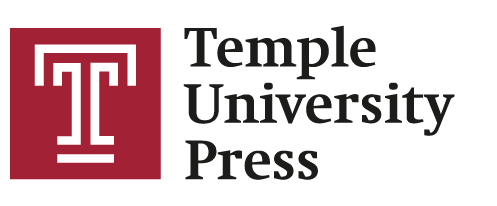
- Parent company: Temple University Libraries
- Founded: 1969
- Country of origin: United States
- Headquarters location: Philadelphia, Pennsylvania
- Distribution: Chicago Distribution Center (US); Combined Academic Publishers (UK)
- Publication types: Books
- Official website: tupress.temple.edu

Temple University Press is a university press founded in 1969 that is part of Temple University (Philadelphia, Pennsylvania). It is one of thirteen publishers to participate in the Knowledge Unlatched pilot, a global library consortium approach to funding open access books.

The organization's mission at the time of its founding, according to Gerald J. Mangone, Temple University's then-provost, was to "broaden the outlet for the best volumes of an increasinbly productive faculty," by enabling those academics "to publish significant research that will increase knowledge in the humanities, social and natural sciences."

== History ==
Maurice English was appointed as the first director of the organization. An honors graduate of Harvard University who had been awarded a Fulbright creative writing fellowship in recognition of the publication of his book, Midnight in the Century, English was a recipient of the Ferguson Prize for Poetry in 1965, bureau chief for Voice of America, and a senior editor for the University of Chicago Press prior to his hiring by Temple. According to English, "The goal of a university press is primarily to maintain and express the standards of its university in the realms of scholarship and research."

By the 1980s and 1990s, Temple University Press had become a globally respected scholarly press. Directed by David Bartlett during this era, the organization's mission had been broadened to not only publish the work of scholars at Temple University, "but to aid in the dissemination of work by scholars across the nation and around the world." Still considered a mid-sized university press in the United States in 1989, it published "twice as many" books that year as it did in 1988, for a total of roughly sixty publications released and approximately two million dollars in sales. Its best-selling book that decade was Still Philadelphia: A Photographic History, 1890-1940 by Fredric M. Miller, Morris J. Vogel, and Allen F. Davis. Between its 1983 release and early January 1989, it had sold roughly twelve thousand copies. In 1984, it was awarded the Philadelphia Book Clinic Certificate of Award.

Publication successes during the 1990s included Nancy Whittier's Feminist Generations: The Persistence of the Radical Women's Movement, which was awarded the Outstanding Academic Title for 1995 by Choice.

In 2000, the press published the autobiography of longtime Philadelphia television news anchorman, Larry Kane. Released in September of that year, Larry Kane's Philadelphia presented Kane's recollections of major breaking news events such as the riots at the 1968 Democratic National Convention and the 1985 MOVE bombing, as well as his candid descriptions of his fellow reporters, local, national and world leaders, and entertainment personalities, including Philadelphia mayor Frank Rizzo, Pope John Paul II, The Beatles, Charles Barkley, performers in the annual Mummers Parade, and Frank Sinatra. The forward for Kane's book was written by veteran American journalist Dan Rather.

In January 2005, the press published its first children's book, P Is for Philadelphia, an "alphabetic tour of the city and the region, illustrated by the area's public school children." Released in time to be used by teachers for Read Across America Day, which was sponsored by the National Education Association, the book was written by Susan Korman.

In 2014, Mary Rose Muccie was named executive director of Temple University Press and Temple University's library officer for scholarly communications.

Aaron Javsicas was named editor-in-chief of the press in 2016. An acquisitions editor at Temple University Press who spent his formative years at the Greenwood Friends School before honing his editorial and management skills as an intern at the Press Enterprise in Bloomsburg, Pennsylvania, as a production assistant at a New Orleans weekly newspaper and as an acquisitions editor in the scholarly and textbook divisions of Palgrave MacMillan and W. W. Norton & Company, Javsicas oversees the production of academic and historical books.

== Abridged list of publications ==
=== 1970s ===
- Aurand, Harold W. From the Molly Maguires to the United Mine Workers: The Social Ecology of an Industrial Union, 1869-1897. Philadelphia, Pennsylvania: Temple University Press, 1971.
- McGrath. Earl J. Should Students Share the Power? Philadelphia, Pennsylvania: Temple University Press, August 19, 1970.

=== 1980s ===
- Miller, Fredric M., Allen F. Davis, and Morris Vogel. Still Philadelphia: A Photographic History, 1890-1940 (winner of the Philadelphia Book Clinic Certificate of Award, 1984). Philadelphia, Pennsylvania: Temple University Press, March 1983.
- Theoharis, Athan G. and John Stuart Cox. The Boss: J. Edgar Hoover and the Great American Inquisition. Philadelphia, Pennsylvania: Temple University Press, 1988 (out of print).

=== 1990s ===
- Francione, Gary L. Animals, Property, and the Law. Philadelphia, Pennsylvania: Temple University Press, May 1995.
- Whittier, Nancy. Feminist Generations: The Persistence of the Radical Women's Movement (winner of the Outstanding Academic Title, in Choice, 1995). Philadelphia, Pennsylvania: Temple University Press, June 1995.

=== 2000s ===
- Kane, Larry. Larry Kane's Philadelphia. Philadelphia, Pennsylvania: Temple University Press, September 2000.
- Lyons, Robert S. On Any Given Sunday: A Life of Bert Bell. Philadelphia, Pennsylvania: Temple University Press, November 2009.

=== 2010-2020 ===
- Ecenbarger, William. Pennsylvania Stories Well Told. Philadelphia, Pennsylvania: Temple University Press, March 2017.
- Yee, Shirley J. An Immigrant Neighborhood: Interethnic and Interracial Encounters in New York before 1930." Philadelphia, Pennsylvania: Temple University Press, December 2011.

=== 2021-present ===
- Bennett, Larry, John D. Fairfield, and Patricia Mooney-Melvin, editors. Bringing the Civic Back In: Zane L. Miller and American Urban History. Philadelphia, Pennsylvania: Temple University Press, September 2022.
- Gale, Dennis E. The Misunderstood History of Gentrification: People, Planning, Preservation, and Urban Renewal, 1915-2020. Philadelphia, Pennsylvania: Temple University Press, February 2021.

== See also ==
- List of English-language book publishing companies
- List of university presses
