= Rutgers University Press =

Academic publishing house in New Jersey

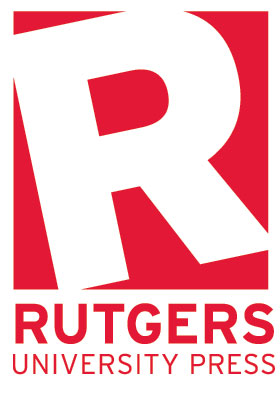
- Founded: 1936
- Country of origin: United States
- Headquarters location: New Brunswick, New Jersey
- Distribution: Chicago Distribution Center (US); UBC Press (Canada); Eurospan Group (Europe)
- Key people: Micah Kleit (Director)
- Publication types: Books
- Official website: rutgersuniversitypress.org

Rutgers University Press (RUP) is a nonprofit academic publishing house, operating in New Brunswick, New Jersey under the auspices of Rutgers University.

== History ==
Rutgers University Press, a nonprofit academic publishing house operating in Piscataway, New Jersey, under the auspices of Rutgers University, was founded on March 26, 1936. Since then, the press has grown in size and the scope of its publishing program. Among the original areas of specialization were Civil War history and European history. The press’ current areas of specialization include sociology, anthropology, health policy, history of medicine, human rights, urban studies, Jewish studies, American studies, film and media studies, the environment, and books about New Jersey and the mid–Atlantic region. The press consists of a small team of 18 full-time staff members.

== Publishing partnerships ==
In 2018, Rutgers University Press entered into a partnership with Bucknell University Press.

In 2021, Rutgers University Press entered into a partnership with University of Delaware Press.

== Open access ==
Rutgers is one of thirteen publishers to participate in the Knowledge Unlatched pilot, a global library consortium approach to funding open access books.

== Notable series ==
Rutgers University Press has more than eighty series of books, both past and current. This is a list of notable series by the press.

=== The American Campus ===
This series, edited by Harold S. Wechsler, covers recent developments and public policy issues in higher education in the United States. Topics include access to college and affordability; drop-out rates; tenure and academic freedom; campus labor; the expansion of administrative posts and salaries; the crisis in the humanities and the arts; the corporate university and for-profit colleges; online education; controversy in sports programs; and gender, ethnic, racial, religious, and class dynamics and diversity.

=== Comics Culture ===
The Comics Culture series, edited by Corey K. Creekmur, Craig Fischer, Jeet Heer, and Ana Merino, focuses on the artistic, historical, social, and cultural significance of newspaper comic strips, comic books, and graphic novels. Some entries in the series focus on individual comics titles, characters, writers, or artists, while others are about major themes, genres, traditions, and topics in comics studies.

=== Global Media & Race ===
The Global Media & Race series is edited by Frederick Luis Aldama. Books in this series take a comparative and interdisciplinary approach to race and intersectionality in the media, from script to production and policy

=== Key Words in Jewish Studies ===
Key Words in Jewish Studies, edited by Deborah Dash Moore, MacDonald Moore, and Andrew Bush, discusses Jewish studies and its place in broader cultural studies through histories of terms currently in use in the field.

=== Nature, Society, and Culture ===
Nature, Society and Culture, edited by Scott Frickel, publishes sociological analyses of the environment. Topics include environmental inequality and risk, the science and politics of climate change and serial disaster, and the environmental causes and consequences of urbanization and war-making.

== See also ==
- List of English-language book publishing companies
- List of university presses
