= Open Book Publishers =

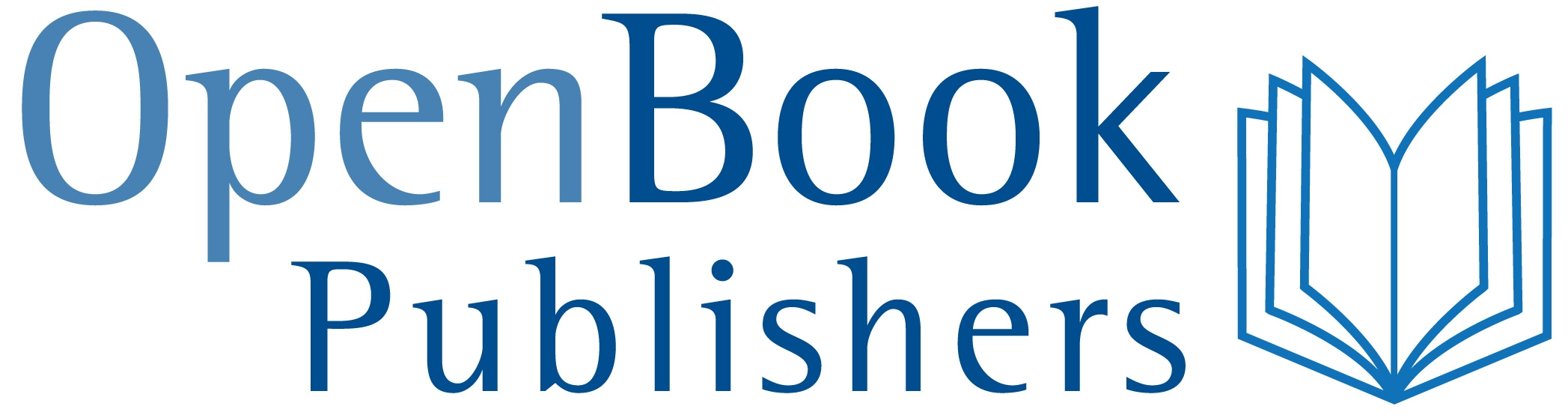
- Founded: 2008
- Founder: Rupert Gatti, Alessandra Tosi and William St Clair
- Country of origin: United Kingdom
- Headquarters location: Cambridge, England
- Publication types: Books
- Official website: www.openbookpublishers.com

Open Book Publishers (OBP) is an open access academic book publisher based in the United Kingdom. It is a non-profit social enterprise and community interest company (CIC) that promotes open access for academic monographs, edited collections, critical editions and textbooks in the Humanities, Social Sciences, Mathematics and Science. All OBP books are peer-reviewed.

All OBP titles are open access, and are available in free editions in PDF, HTML and XML formats on the publisher's website, and a number of platforms including Google Books, Worldreader, OpenEdition, DOAB, The European Library and Europeana. Some editions are hosted on Wikiversity in socially editable format, e.g. In the Lands of the Romanovs: An Annotated Bibliography by Anthony Cross (Cambridge: Open Book Publishers, 2015). Readers in developing countries can access OBP titles using e-readers and 2G mobile phones via Worldreader. Open Book Publishers is a partner in the COPIM project, building not-for-profit community-owned, open infrastructures to enable open access book publishing to prosper. OBP is a founder member of ScholarLed, a collective of not-for-profit, academic-led, open access book publishers. It is also a founder and co-ordinator of the Open Access Books Network, a free and open network for anyone interested in open access books.

== History ==
Open Book Publishers was founded in 2008 by Rupert Gatti and Alessandra Tosi, both academics from the University of Cambridge. William St Clair joined OBP in 2009 and became the chairman of the board of directors, a role he held until his death in 2021. OBP is now the biggest independent open access academic publisher of monographs in the UK. By the autumn of 2021, it had 230 books in its catalogue, all of which are free to read online. With print on demand technology OBP titles are also available in paperback and hardback editions. Some of their titles experiment with innovative formats, e.g. books drawn from online databases, such as A Lexicon of Medieval Nordic Law by Inger Larsson, Ulrika Djärv, Jeffrey Love, Christine Peel, and Erik Simensen (Cambridge: Open Book Publishers, 2020), or embedded audio or video content, such as Denis Diderot 'Rameau's Nephew' – 'Le Neveu de Rameau': A Multi-Media Bilingual Edition, edited by Marianne Hobson, 2nd edition (Cambridge: Open Book Publishers, 2016), which incorporates musical pieces recorded for publication in the book into the body of the text. OBP organized a campaign to republish an out-of-print book by Ruth Finnegan through the crowd source funding platform Unglue.it.

== Business model ==
As open access monographs, the full text of all books published by OBP is licensed under Creative Commons Licenses, although some third party content (e.g. images and music) is not.

OBP has four main sources of revenue:

1. Sales Revenue: Along with the free editions, the publisher retails five different editions (hardback, paperback, EPUB, and MOBI). These editions are sold via their website and through all the expected retail channels (Amazon, etc.).
2. Publishing Grants: Though OBP does not impose a mandatory publishing charge on authors, they do encourage authors to apply for grants to offset publication costs.
3. Library Membership Scheme: Member libraries pay an annual fee and OBP in turn provides a range of reader-targeted benefits for members of the subscribing university.
4. OBP Grants and Donations: general donations and grants given directly to OBP to support their work.

As a not-for-profit enterprise, all excess revenue at OBP is reinvested in the company and this enables OBP to publish peer-reviewed books by authors with limited funding. Academic merit and public value determine publication decisions, not ability to pay a fee.

== See also ==
- Open Humanities Press
- Punctum Books
- Open access monograph
- World Oral Literature Project, which is a partner of OBP
- International Network for the Availability of Scientific Publications (INASP), which OBP is part of.
- COPIM
