= Annual Review of Immunology =

- Discipline: Immunology
- Language: English
- Edited by: Wayne M. Yokoyama

Publication details
- History: 1983–present, 43 years old
- Publisher: Annual Reviews (US)
- Frequency: Annually
- Open access: Subscribe to Open
- Impact factor: 39.8 (2025)

Standard abbreviations
- ISO 4: Annu. Rev. Immunol.

Indexing
- CODEN: ARIMDU
- ISSN: 0732-0582 (print); 1545-3278 (web)
- OCLC no.: 909429737

Links
- Journal homepage

The Annual Review of Immunology is a peer-reviewed scientific journal published by Annual Reviews (AR). It releases an annual volume of review articles relevant to the field of immunology. It was first published in 1983 with inaugural editor William E. Paul; Paul remained editor for the journal's first thirty years. As of 2022, its editor is Wayne M. Yokoyama. As of 2023, Annual Review of Immunology is being published as open access, under the Subscribe to Open model. As of 2026, Journal Citation Reports gives the journal a 2025 impact factor of 39.8, ranking it second of 183 journals in the category "Immunology".

== History ==
During the 1982 Midwinter Conference of Immunologists at the Asilomar Conference Grounds, a meeting of prominent immunologists was convened to discuss the need for a new journal that published review articles about immunological topics. Interest was high, with many meeting attendees agreeing that such a journal would be useful and offering to write a review for the first volume. The first volume of the Annual Review of Immunology appeared in 1983, making it the twenty-fifth journal title published by Annual Reviews (AR), a nonprofit organization whose stated mission is to synthesize knowledge "for the progress of science and the benefit of society." As of 2021, it is published both online and in print. Some of its articles are available online prior to the volume publication date.

== Scope and indexing ==
The Annual Review of Immunology defines its scope as covering significant developments in immunology, including processes of the immune system, etiology of immune disorders, the innate and adaptive immune systems, the production and differentiation of immune cells, control of viral, bacterial, and parasitic pathogens. Also of interest is immune control of cancer, immunodeficiency, and autoimmune diseases. It is abstracted and indexed in Scopus, Science Citation Index Expanded, MEDLINE, EMBASE, Chemical Abstracts Core, and Academic Search, among others.

== Editorial processes ==
The Annual Review of Immunology is helmed by the editor or the co-editors. The editor is assisted by the editorial committee, which includes associate editors, regular members, and occasionally guest editors. Guest members participate at the invitation of the editor, and serve terms of one year. All other members of the editorial committee are appointed by the AR board of directors and serve five-year terms. The editorial committee determines which topics should be included in each volume and solicits reviews from qualified authors. Unsolicited manuscripts are not accepted. Peer review of accepted manuscripts is undertaken by the editorial committee.

=== Editors of volumes ===
Dates indicate publication years in which someone was credited as a lead editor or co-editor of a journal volume. The planning process for a volume begins well before the volume appears, so appointment to the position of lead editor generally occurred prior to the first year shown here. An editor who has retired or died may be credited as a lead editor of a volume that they helped to plan, even if it is published after their retirement or death.

- William E. Paul (1983–2012)
- Wayne M. Yokoyama and Dan Littman (2013–2018)
- Yokoyama (2019–present)

=== Current editorial board ===
As of 2025, the editorial committee consists of the editor and the following members:

- Kristin A. Hogquist
- John J. O'Shea
- Avery August
- Gabrielle Belz
- Chen Dong
- Donna L. Farber
- Katherine A. Fitzgerald
- Tomohiro Kurosaki
- Jenny P.Y. Ting

As of 2022, it was composed by:

- Kristin A. Hogquist
- John J. O'Shea
- Avery August
- Gregory M. Barton
- Chen Dong
- Donna L. Farber
- Bana Jabri
- Erika L. Pearce
- Jenny P. Y. Ting
