= Annual Reviews (publisher) =

Publisher of academic journals

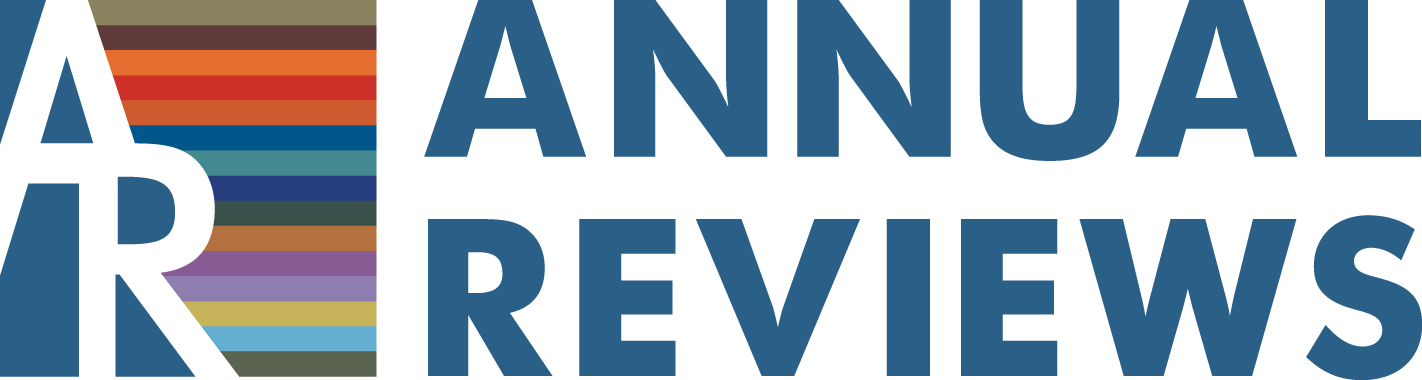
- Founded: 1931
- Founder: J. Murray Luck
- Country of origin: United States
- Headquarters location: San Mateo, California
- Key people: Richard B. Gallagher (president & editor-in-chief); Karen S. Cook (board co-chair); Sandra Faber (board co-chair)
- Publication types: Academic journals, online magazine
- Nonfiction topics: Life, biomedical, physical, and social sciences
- Official website: www.annualreviews.org

Annual Reviews (AR) is an independent non-profit organization whose stated mission is to synthesize knowledge "for the progress of science and the benefit of society". AR is based in San Mateo, California. As of 2025, AR publishes 51 academic journals of review articles for researchers in the fields of life, biomedical, physical, and social sciences; Knowable Magazine and Knowable en español, science journalism for the public; and Katina Magazine for librarians, publishers and vendors.

AR developed the open access initiative Subscribe to Open (S2O). Under S2O a journal's newest volume is published open access if subscription support is sufficient. Beginning in 2023 and 2024, all 51 volumes were released as open access under the S2O model. As of 2026, the S2O journals are published under a CC BY-NC-ND 4.0 license. AR also supports Knowledge Unlatched for crowdfunding open access to scholarly resources, and the Charleston Conference for librarianship. As of July 2026, AR acquired the event technology provider Underline Science, a platform to support research communities and organize conferences.

The first of the AR journals, the Annual Review of Biochemistry, appeared in 1932 under the editorship of Stanford University chemist J. Murray Luck, who wanted to create a resource that provided critical reviews of contemporary research. The second journal was added in 1939. By 1982, Annual Reviews published 24 titles, and by 2021 it published 51 journals of reviews. Review articles are usually "peer-invited" solicited submissions which then go through a peer-review process. Issues are planned one to two years in advance. The organizational structure has three levels: a volunteer board of directors, editorial committees of experts for each journal, and paid employees.

== History ==
=== Annual Review of Biochemistry ===
The Annual Review of Biochemistry was the creation of Stanford University chemist and professor J. Murray Luck. In designing a course for graduate students in 1930, he saw the need for a resource that condensed the large volume of biochemistry research into review articles. Luck asked about 50 biochemists in the US, United Kingdom, and Canada if an annual volume of critical reviews on biochemistry research would be useful. Response was positive.

Luck formed an initial advisory committee which included Carl L. Alsberg at Stanford, and Dennis Robert Hoagland and Carl Louis August Schmidt from the University of California, Berkeley. Stanford University Press agreed to publish the journal on a three-year contract, with financial assistance from the Chemical Foundation headed by Francis Garvan. Stanford University gave the journal rent-free office space in the Physiology building (Outer Quad) beginning in 1931. The first volume of the Annual Review of Biochemistry was published as of May 3, 1932.

=== Legal identity ===
At the completion of the contract with Stanford University Press, the advisory committee of the journal decided to assume a legal identity as the journal's publisher, though keeping Stanford University Press as the printer. On December 12, 1934, they submitted articles of incorporation with the California Secretary of State to create the Annual Review of Biochemistry, Ltd., which was organized as a nonprofit. In February 1938, the name was changed to Annual Reviews, Inc. On March 28, 2008, the California Secretary of State approved an amendment to the Articles of Incorporation to change the name officially to Annual Reviews.

=== Leadership ===
J. Murray Luck worked for Annual Reviews from 1932 to 1968 and was the founding editor of its first two journals: the Annual Review of Biochemistry (1932-1965) and the Annual Review of Physiology (1939-1946). As further journals were added, each one had its own editorial committee, whose lead editor took the title "Editor" or "Co-editor", and Luck assumed the role of editor-in-chief. He retired from this position as of 1969, but continued to serve on the board of directors as an emeritus member, as well as on the editorial committee of the Annual Review of Biochemistry.

Robert R. Schultz was the organization's official editor-in-chief from 1970 to 1972. William Kaufmann became editor-in-chief of the organization from 1973 to 1981, followed by Alister Brass from 1981 to 1983. Kaufmann returned from 1983 to 1992. Robert Hall Haynes served as editor-in-chief of the organization from 1992 to 1995. He was succeeded by Samuel Gubins, who held the positions of president and editor-in-chief from 1995 to 2015. The current president and editor-in-chief, Richard B. Gallagher, succeeded Gubins in 2015.

=== Expansion ===
Line chart showing the number of Annual Reviews journals over time View source data.

In 1938, Annual Reviews and the American Physiological Society agreed to collaborate to create a new journal. The first volume of the Annual Review of Physiology was published in 1939, with the help of Victor E. Hall as assistant editor. Although the original intent was to be international in scope, the first European editors were not included until 1948, following World War II.

A third journal, the Annual Review of Microbiology, was created in 1947 under the editorship of Charles E. Clifton. The increased volume of printing was not feasible for Stanford University Press, so printing of the Annual Review of Physiology, the Annual Review of Microbiology and later volumes of the Annual Review of Biochemistry was contracted out to the George Banta Company of Menasha, Wisconsin.

The Annual Reviews journals were recommended to teachers and librarians as well as scientists. In the 1950s, titles in medicine, psychology, plant physiology, physical chemistry, nuclear and particle science, and entomology were added. Stanford University began to have a serious space shortage, which resulted in Annual Reviews constructing a new office building in nearby Palo Alto, California in 1956. After Santa Clara County used eminent domain to take the property at 231 Grant Avenue, Annual Reviews moved again in 1968, to 4139 El Camino Way, Palo Alto.

By 1982, 24 titles were being published by Annual Reviews. After becoming editor-in-chief in 1995, Samuel Gubins oversaw both a further expansion of journal titles and the first electronic publishing of AR journals. The Annual Review of Sociology and the Annual Review of Medicine were the first to be published electronically, in 1996. In 2002, the publisher's entire publication history, covering 70 years and approximately 475,000 pages and 5,400 images, was digitized. The thirtieth journal title was published in 2000. Another 22 titles were added between 2005 and 2019. As of 2021, AR has published 52 journals under 64 title variants. Only one, the Annual Review of Computer Science, is no longer in publication.

AR has also released some specialty publications: The Excitement and Fascination of Science (1965, 1978, 1990, 1995), consisting of four volumes of autobiographies and reflections by prominent scientists, and Intelligence and Affectivity (1981), a translated volume of lectures given by psychologist Jean Piaget in the 1950s.

In 2017, AR announced its first online magazine, Knowable Magazine, with support from the Gordon and Betty Moore Foundation and the Alfred P. Sloan Foundation. With Knowable Magazine, AR expanded beyond scholarly publishing into science journalism and science communication, explaining and emphasizing the real-world significance of scholarly work. In 2022, the initiative was expanded to publish a sister publication, Knowable en español, in Spanish.

In 2021, AR moved its physical office to 1875 S Grant St., Suite 700, San Mateo, California, as the organization's staff increasingly worked from home.

As of 2022 AR acquired The Charleston Advisor, a peer-reviewed publication for librarians. As of 2023 AR also acquired the Charleston Hub and its publication Against the Grain. The Charleston Hub organizes the annual Charleston Conference for academic libraries, librarians, and publishers. A new digital publication called Katina Magazine was launched as of November 12, 2024. It is named after The Charleston Advisor's original founder, Katina Strauch. As of July 2026, AR acquired the event technology provider Underline Science, a platform for research communities and conference organizing.

In 2025, AR signed an agreement with multinational publisher Wiley, bringing the open access (OA) initiative Knowledge Unlatched (KU) under nonprofit management. Knowledge Unlatched was founded in 2012 and introduced a crowdfunding model in which libraries collectively finance open access publication of books and journals. AR's CEO Richard Gallagher credits Knowledge Unlatched as one of the examples that inspired development of AR's Subscribe to Open publishing model.

== Journal format and metrics ==
Each journal publishes one volume per year. As of 2026, all 51 of the current journals are published online, including 42 exclusively online, with 9 journals additionally published in print.

As of 2021, researchers at McGill and Stanford University examined the impact of review articles using a corpus of 6,495 individual review papers published in 54 past and current AR journal titles in the biological, physical, and social sciences. The authors noted that AR articles often focus on emerging fields that may be undergoing structural transformations. Examining impact on scholarly discourse, they concluded that "formal, invited Annual Review articles provide a distinctly authoritative source". By identifying "distinct clusters of work" and articles that bridge such clusters, review articles can integrate a topic. Research suggests that they can "shift discourse in a manner that simultaneously simplifies and collapses a knowledge community", helping to define and organize emergent research areas.

=== Subscribe to Open publishing model ===
Line chart showing the PDF and HTML downloads of the Annual Review of Public Health (purple) after it became open access in 2017. The Annual Review of Medicine (blue) and the Annual Review of Clinical Psychology (red), which were paywalled, are shown for comparison. View source data.

External audio
- Episode 76 "Annual Reviews: Evolving to Better Serve the Public Good", The Authority File, 05/04/2019
- Episode 77 "Annual Reviews: Public Health, an Open-Access Test Case for Review Literature", The Authority File, 03/11/2019
- Episode 78 "Annual Reviews: Science for a Functional Democracy", The Authority File, 03/18/2019
- Episode 79 "Annual Reviews: Subscribe to Open", The Authority File, 03/25/2019

In 2016, the Robert Wood Johnson Foundation awarded six grants for examining the potential for open science and open access, as part of an initiative for Increasing Openness and Transparency in Research. One of the awardees was AR, which was interested in finding ways to remove barriers to access to scientific publications. AR used the grant to release the Annual Review of Public Health under an open access license in April 2017, and tracked the impact of the change in licensing.

By May 2019, usage of the journal had increased eight-fold relative to 2016 to about 200,000 downloads monthly. For comparison, the titles for clinical psychology and medicine that maintained gated access showed no change in usage. In addition, the audience for the journal increased from 1,100 institutions in 57 countries (2016) to 7,220 institutions in 137 countries (2018).

AR has continued to explore the possibilities of open access by developing the "Subscribe to Open" (S2O) publishing model. Subscribe to Open is an example of an assurance contract. In the S2O pilot for 2020, subscribing institutions were asked to maintain their existing subscriptions to the offered journals, less a 5% discount, on the understanding that if enough subscriptions were received, the final content for the journals would be published as open access. If enough subscriptions were not received, the content would remain paywalled. In this way S2O appealed to the individual subscriber's economic self-interest (receiving a discount instead of paying full price), and avoided reliance on collective behavior or altruism. The approach allowed participating publishers to convert content from gated to open access on a year-to-year basis.

As of September 1, 2019, the 2020 pilot program for S2O included two publishers, AR and Berghahn Books, both of whom opened part of their content. AR offered five titles in the S2O pilot, the Annual Review of Cancer Biology, the Annual Review of Environment and Resources, the Annual Review of Nuclear and Particle Science, the Annual Review of Political Science, and the Annual Review of Public Health. All were published as open access through the Subscribe to Open approach.

Additional publishers have since adopted S2O, which is seen as benefiting libraries, researchers and publishers alike. In a survey commissioned by the Association of Learned and Professional Society Publishers to determine how publishers aligned with Plan S, authors Alicia Wise and Lorraine Estelle called Subscribe to Open "the most promising" transformative agreement for publishers, as it offers a predictable revenue stream.

In April 2022, the publisher announced that new content from all of its 51 academic journals would progressively be made openly available over the course of eighteen months under the S2O framework, provided that current subscription support is maintained. As of 2026, all journal volumes from 2023-2025 had been released as open access. AR reported a 2-to-3 times increase in readership globally as a result.

=== Availability ===
AR journals are available in a number of ways, depending in part on the journal. Each journal is available electronically with some also offered as a bound annual volume. Subscriptions are offered for the online version, print version, or both when print is available, and individual articles can be purchased online. Journals are also available as a database consisting of some or all of the journals, with site licenses.

Effective January 2008, purchasing a subscription includes online access that entitles the subscriber to permanent access rights to that volume regardless of future subscription status.

In 2020, the following titles were published open access using S2O: Annual Review of Cancer Biology, Annual Review of Environment and Resources, Annual Review of Nuclear and Particle Science, Annual Review of Political Science, and Annual Review of Public Health. In 2021, the Annual Review of Biomedical Engineering, the Annual Review of Genomics and Human Genetics and the Annual Review of Virology were added to the program. Beginning in 2023 and 2024, all 51 volumes were released as open access under the S2O model.

=== Rankings ===
As of 2026, Journal Citation Reports has given 16 AR journal titles a rank of "1", indicating high quality and importance in one or more categories. The top five AR titles by impact factor are:

- Annual Review of Organizational Psychology and Organizational Behavior (55.9)
- Annual Review of Psychology (41.8)
- Annual Review of Immunology (39.8)
- Annual Review of Astronomy and Astrophysics (37.3)
- Annual Review of Pathology: Mechanisms of Disease (34.5)

== Organization structure ==
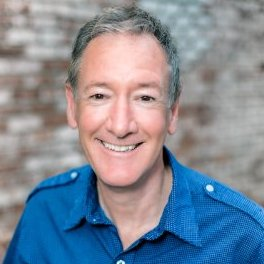
Richard Gallagher, President and Editor-in-Chief since 2015

There are three leadership structures within AR: The board of directors and its committees, editors and editorial committees, and a management team. The board of directors consists of experts of various scientific disciplines, philanthropists, and business people, who serve as volunteers. The board is assisted by the business affairs committee and additional ad hoc committees. Together, the board and its committees develop and approve fiscal policies and budgets. They also review the organization's financial performance and publishing strategy. The board is co-chaired by Karen S. Cook, professor of sociology at Stanford University and Sandra M. Faber, professor of astronomy and astrophysics at University of California, Santa Cruz.

The contents of each journal published by AR is selected by the lead editor or co-editors and their editorial committees, about ten members total, who are researchers in the discipline. Committee terms are five years. The management team provides expertise in academic publishing, and is led by the president, who is also its editor-in-chief.

== List of journals ==
AR publishes a variety of journals in the biomedical and life sciences, physical sciences, and social sciences, including economics. Years in parentheses indicate the first year of publication. As of 2025, the publications included the following:

=== A ===
- Annual Review of Analytical Chemistry (2008)
- Annual Review of Animal Biosciences (2013)
- Annual Review of Anthropology (1972)
- Annual Review of Astronomy and Astrophysics (1963)

=== B ===
- Annual Review of Biochemistry (1932)
- Annual Review of Biomedical Data Science (2018)
- Annual Review of Biomedical Engineering (1999)
- Annual Review of Biophysics (1972) (formerly Annual Review of Biophysics and Bioengineering, 1972-1984; Annual Review of Biophysics and Biophysical Chemistry, 1985-1991; Annual Review of Biophysics and Biomolecular Structure, 1992-2007.)

=== C ===
- Annual Review of Cancer Biology (2017)
- Annual Review of Cell and Developmental Biology (1985) (formerly Annual Review of Cell Biology, 1985-1994.)
- The Charleston Advisor (1999)
- Annual Review of Chemical and Biomolecular Engineering (2010)
- Annual Review of Clinical Psychology (2005)
- Annual Review of Computer Science (1986–1990)
- Annual Review of Condensed Matter Physics (2010)
- Annual Review of Control, Robotics, and Autonomous Systems (2018)
- Annual Review of Criminology (2018)

=== D ===
- Annual Review of Developmental Psychology (2019)

=== E ===
- Annual Review of Earth and Planetary Sciences (1973)
- Annual Review of Ecology, Evolution, and Systematics (1970) (formerly Annual Review of Ecology and Systematics, 1970-2002.)
- Annual Review of Economics (2009)
- Annual Review of Entomology (1956)
- Annual Review of Environment and Resources (1976) (formerly Annual Review of Energy, 1976-1990; Annual Review of Energy and the Environment, 1991-2002.)

=== F ===
- Annual Review of Financial Economics (2009)
- Annual Review of Fluid Mechanics (1969)
- Annual Review of Food Science and Technology (2010)

=== G ===
- Annual Review of Genetics (1967)
- Annual Review of Genomics and Human Genetics (2000)

=== I ===
- Annual Review of Immunology (1983)

=== K ===
- Katina Magazine (2024)
- Knowable Magazine (2017)
- Knowable en Español (October 13, 2022)

=== L ===
- Annual Review of Law and Social Science (2005)
- Annual Review of Linguistics (2015)

=== M ===
- Annual Review of Marine Science (2009)
- Annual Review of Materials Research (1971) (formerly Annual Review of Materials Science, 1971-2000.)
- Annual Review of Medicine (1950)
- Annual Review of Microbiology (1947)

=== N ===
- Annual Review of Neuroscience (1978)
- Annual Review of Nuclear and Particle Science (1952) (formerly Annual Review of Nuclear Science, 1952-1977.)
- Annual Review of Nutrition (1981)

=== O ===
- Annual Review of Organizational Psychology and Organizational Behavior (2014)

=== P ===
- Annual Review of Pathology: Mechanisms of Disease (2006)
- Annual Review of Pharmacology and Toxicology (1961) (formerly Annual Review of Pharmacology, 1961-1975).
- Annual Review of Physical Chemistry (1950)
- Annual Review of Physiology (1939)
- Annual Review of Phytopathology (1963)
- Annual Review of Plant Biology (1950) (formerly Annual Review of Plant Physiology, 1950-1987; Annual Review of Plant Physiology and Plant Molecular Biology, 1988-2001.)
- Annual Review of Political Science (1998)
- Annual Review of Psychology (1950)
- Annual Review of Public Health (1980)

=== R ===
- Annual Review of Resource Economics (2009)

=== S ===
- Annual Review of Sociology (1975)
- Annual Review of Statistics and Its Application (2014)

=== V ===
- Annual Review of Virology (2014)
- Annual Review of Vision Science (2015)
