= Frances Pinter =

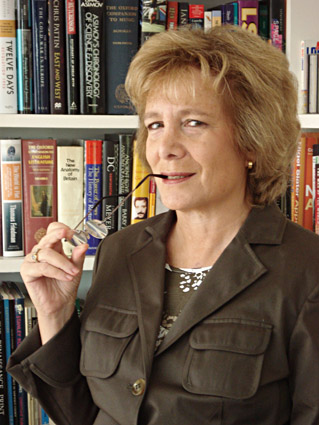
Frances Pinter

Frances Pinter (born 13 June 1949) is a publisher who founded Knowledge Unlatched, a not-for-profit company creating a global library consortium enabling sustainable open access academic book publishing. She was also the CEO of Manchester University Press from 2013-2016.

== Education ==
Pinter received her PhD in International Relations from University College London and her B.A. in Political Science from New York University. She also studied as a General Course Student at the London School of Economics.

== Publishing career ==
=== Pinter Publishers ===
Frances Pinter set up her own publishing company, Pinter Publishers, in 1973, at the age of 23, which focussed on the social sciences and is believed to be the first British publishing company owned by a woman. In 1985 she was joined by Iain Stevenson who founded the environmental imprint Belhaven Press and in 1986 acquired the humanities publisher Leicester University Press. Belhaven Press was sold to John Wiley & Sons in 1993 and Pinter Publishers itself disposed to Cassell (publisher) in 1995.

=== The Centre for Publishing Development ===
In 1994 financier and philanthropist George Soros hired Pinter to become the head of his Open Society Institute's international publishing program, whose goal was to support publishing and education in Central and Eastern Europe and the former Soviet Union after the fall of Communism. She established "The Centre for Publishing Development", which became part of the "Information Program" (whose staff are based in Budapest, London, and New York), a later initiative of the Open Society Institute. During that time she established the Central European University Press, EIFL, and initiated numerous other projects.

=== Bloomsbury Academic ===
Pinter was the founding publisher at Bloomsbury Academic from 2008-2012, an imprint of the Bloomsbury Publishing Group, which publishes titles in the Social Sciences and Humanities; Bloomsbury Academic both markets the books commercially using print on demand technology and also provides free digital versions with Creative Commons licenses for non-commercial use. At Bloomsbury Academic she was the Publisher of the Winston Churchill Archives.

== Other Activities ==
Pinter is a visiting fellow at the London School of Economics, where she conducts research into how active participants in global civil society frame the reform agenda of intellectual property rights. Previously, she served as a consultant to Creative Commons.

Pinter was also project leader of Publishing and Alternative Licensing Model of Africa (PALM Africa), a project based in Uganda and South Africa funded by the IDRC. The goal of the project was to study whether flexible licensing arrangements (such as Creative Commons) are viable models for local publishers, and what business models emerge from this approach.

From 2002 to 2006, Pinter was CEO of International House Trust, which owns a London-based language school as well as a 50% share of the 150 school network International House World Organisation Ltd.

Pinter was a trustee of Redress, a charity focussed on helping torture survivors.

Frances Pinter’s contribution to academic publishing was recognised at an early age as she became the youngest (and only the second) woman to be elected to the Publishers Association governing council, the youngest deputy director of the PA’s Book Development Council, the youngest publisher ever to lead official publishing trade delegations to Japan, Korea and China. She also sat on numerous committees and advisory boards.

In February 2015, Frances Pinter was awarded an Honorary Doctorate of Letters by Curtin University, for her leadership in open access publishing. She is an associate member of Curtin University's The Centre for Culture and Technology (CCAT) under its New Models of Publishing research program.
