= Michael G. Pratt =

American psychologist

- Born: Erie, Pennsylvania, U.S.
- Education: University of Dayton (bachelor's); University of Michigan (MA, PhD)
- Known for: Research on organizational identity, identification, meaningful work, ambivalence and intuition; qualitative research methods
- Awards: Fellow of the Academy of Management; Academy of Management Review Best Paper Award (2007)

Michael G. Pratt is an American organizational psychologist and the O'Connor Family Professor at the Carroll School of Management at Boston College. His research examines organizational identity, meaningful work, ambivalence, and the ways people relate to their workplaces and professions. He is a Fellow of the Academy of Management.

== Early life and education ==
Pratt earned a bachelor's degree from the University of Dayton and master's and doctoral degrees in organizational psychology from the University of Michigan. He received his PhD in 1994.

== Academic career ==
Pratt joined the faculty of the University of Illinois Urbana-Champaign in 1994, where he progressed from assistant professor to associate professor in 2001 and professor in 2007. He remained at the university until 2008, when he joined Boston College's Carroll School of Management.

At Boston College, he was named the inaugural O'Connor Professor in 2011. The professorship was established by university trustee David P. O'Connor and his wife, Maureen A. O'Connor.His academic responsibilities have included directing the school's doctoral program in organization studies. He also holds a courtesy appointment in the Department of Psychology and has been a fellow of the Winston Center for Leadership and Ethics.

Pratt's other academic affiliations have included a visiting scholar appointment at Harvard Business School in 2015 and a faculty affiliation with the University of Michigan's Center for Positive Organizations. He has also served as chair of the Academy of Management's Managerial and Organizational Cognition division and on the International Advisory Board of the Center for the Advancement of Research Methods and Analysis.

His editorial work has included roles at Academy of Management Journal, Administrative Science Quarterly, and Annual Review of Organizational Psychology and Organizational Behavior. He was the first qualitative associate editor of Academy of Management Journal.

== Research ==
Pratt's research has examined how people how people connect with their work and develop relationships with the organizations and professions to which they belong. His studies have included work on identification among Amway distributors and the role of clothing in expressing social identities within organizations. In a 2004 survey of Academy of Management Journal editorial board members, Pratt's study of Amway distributors was included in a 2006 editorial essay on interesting management research.

In a study of medical residents, Pratt and his co-authors examined how professional identities develop through work and learning. With Eliana Crosina, he later studied how former Lehman Brothers employees responded to the loss of their organization, developing a model of organizational mourning.^{[8]} Other collaborative research has examined trust among firefighters and the effects of remote working arrangements on employees who remain in the office.

With Erik Dane, Pratt co-authored a paper on intuition in managerial decision-making, which received the Academy of Management Review Best Paper Award for 2007. He has also published on qualitative research methods and co-edited Artifacts and Organizations: Beyond Mere Symbolism (2006) and The Oxford Handbook of Organizational Identity (2016).

== Awards and honors ==
- Fellow of the Academy of Management (2014)
- Academy of Management Review Best Paper Award, 2007 (with Erik Dane)
- Distinguished Scholar Award, Managerial and Organizational Cognition Division, Academy of Management (2016)
- Coughlin Distinguished Teaching Award, Carroll School of Management (2022)
- Distinguished Service Award, Managerial and Organizational Cognition Division, Academy of Management (2024)

== Selected works ==
Books (edited)

- Rafaeli, Anat; Pratt, Michael G. (eds.) (2006). "Artifacts and Organizations: Beyond Mere Symbolism". Lawrence Erlbaum Associates.
- Pratt, Michael G.; Schultz, Majken; Ashforth, Blake E.; Ravasi, Davide (eds.) (2016). "The Oxford Handbook of Organizational Identity". Oxford University Press. ISBN 978-0-19-968957-6.

==== Articles ====
- Pratt, Michael G. (2000). "The Good, the Bad, and the Ambivalent: Managing Identification among Amway Distributors". Administrative Science Quarterly 45(3): 456–493. doi:10.2307/2667106
- Pratt, Michael G.; Foreman, Peter O. (2000). "Classifying Managerial Responses to Multiple Organizational Identities". Academy of Management Review 25(1): 18–42. doi:10.5465/amr.2000.2791601
- Dane, Erik; Pratt, Michael G. (2007). "Exploring Intuition and its Role in Managerial Decision Making". Academy of Management Review 32(1): 33–54. doi:10.5465/AMR.2007.23463682
