= The Charleston Advisor =

- Discipline: Library science
- Language: English
- Edited by: George Machovec

Publication details
- History: 1999–2024
- Publisher: The Charleston Company (1999–2022); Annual Reviews (publisher) (2022–2024) (United States)
- Frequency: Quarterly
- Open access: Hybrid

Standard abbreviations
- ISO 4: Charlest. Advis.

Indexing
- ISSN: 1525-4011 (print); 1525-4003 (web)
- LCCN: sn99008755
- OCLC no.: 41542348

Links
- Journal homepage

The Charleston Advisor (July 1999 – July 2024) was a peer-reviewed publication that reviewed proprietary and free Internet resources that libraries license and make available to their patrons. The journal's tag line was "Critical reviews of web products for information professionals." It was published quarterly.

Inspiration for the publication came from Katina Strauch, Head of Technical Services at the College of Charleston and the founder of the Charleston Conference. The publisher of the journal was Becky Lenzini, and the managing editor throughout its 25-year run was George Machovec.

The journal won a Readers' Choice Award. It provided the ccAdvisor online review facility with the magazine Choice. In 2022 The Charleston Advisor was sold by The Charleston Company to science publisher Annual Reviews. The last issue of The Charleston Advisor, a retrospective from its 25-year history, was published on 1 July 2024 as Volume 25, number 5. Subscribers received permanent access rights to the archive of over 1,500 published articles.

A new digital publication called Katina Magazine, after Katina Strauch, was launched to succeed The Charleston Advisor on November 12, 2024. Katina Magazine publishes library resource reviews and other content relating to open access and library and information science.
