= Richard Gallagher =

Richard Gallagher may refer to:

- Richard B. Gallagher, Scottish academic publisher
- Richard F. Gallagher (1909–1995), American coach
- Richard "Skeets" Gallagher (1891–1955), American actor
- Richard H. Gallagher (1927–1997), American academic and engineer

== See also ==
- Dick Gallagher, American pianist and composer
