= Open Encyclopedia of Anthropology =

Online anthropology encyclopedia

Open Encyclopedia of Anthropology (OEA)
- Website type: Online encyclopedia of anthropology
- Available in: English; French
- Owners: Open Knowledge Press (2022–present); University of Cambridge (2017–22)
- Founder: Felix Stein
- Editors: Hanna Nieber (2023-ongoing); Rachel Cantave (2023-ongoing); Riddhi Bhandari (2023-ongoing); Felix Stein (2017-2022)
- Website: www.anthroencyclopedia.com
- Launched: 2017; 9 years ago
- ISSN: 2398-516X

The Open Encyclopedia of Anthropology (also known as the OEA and formerly known as the Cambridge Encyclopedia of Anthropology) is a free, peer-reviewed open access encyclopedia dedicated to the encyclopedic coverage of social and cultural anthropology.

== Peer review ==
All Open Encyclopedia of Anthropology entries are peer-reviewed by at least three anonymous experts reviewers; the articles are also reviewed by the work's managing editors. The review process employed by the encyclopedia is single-blind, meaning that the reviewers know who the authors are, but the authors are unaware as to who reviewed their work.

== History ==
The publication was originally launched in November 2017 as the Cambridge Encyclopedia of Anthropology, a collaboration between Felix Stein and the University of Cambridge's Department of Social Anthropology. It was relaunched as an inter-departmental publication under the name Open Encyclopedia of Anthropology in January 2023 by the Germany-based NGO Verlag Offenes Wissen (Open Knowledge Press). The encyclopedia is listed in both the Directory of Open Access Journals (DOAJ) the Directory of Open Access Scholarly Resources (ROAD).

== Funding ==
The encyclopedia was initially funded by the Wenner-Gren Foundation and an Economic and Social Research Council "Impact Acceleration" grant. In 2023, the encyclopedia signed an agreement with the German open access service provider Knowledge Unlatched, whereby Knowledge Unlatched will support the publication of 18 articles per year for three years.
