= Alex Inkeles =

American sociologist and social psychologist

- Born: March 4, 1920; Brooklyn, New York
- Died: July 9, 2010 (aged 90); Palo Alto, California
- Citizenship: US
- Education: Cornell University; Columbia University
- Partner: Bernadette née Kane
- Children: 1
- Scientific career
- Workplaces: United States Army; Office of Strategic Services; Harvard University; Stanford University

Alex Inkeles (March 4, 1920 – July 9, 2010) was an American sociologist and social psychologist. His main areas of research were national character and the culture and society of the Soviet Union. His career was mostly spent at Harvard University and Stanford University. In addition to being the founding editor of the Annual Review of Sociology, some of his recognitions included membership in the National Academy of Sciences, American Academy of Arts and Sciences, and American Philosophical Society.

== Early life and education ==
Alex Inkeles was born on March 4, 1920 in Brooklyn, New York. His parents were Jewish immigrants from Poland, though lived in a neighborhood that predominantly consisted of Sicilians. He attended Cornell University for his bachelor's degree in 1941 and master's degree in 1946. While at Cornell, he took several high-level courses in the Russian language. After World War II he attended Columbia University for his PhD, graduating in 1949.

== Career ==
He spent World War II digging telephone poles for the US Army Signal Corps. He later received orders from the Office of Strategic Services that reassigned him to reading Soviet newspapers and listening to Soviet radio due to his proficiency with Russian. In the post-war era, his research often focused on Soviet society. He authored Public Opinion in Soviet Russia in 1950 and The Soviet Citizen: Daily Life in a Totalitarian Society in 1961. Inkeles joined the staff of Harvard University in 1948 when he was hired to lead the field work for large-scale interviews of Soviet émigrés in Europe. He became a full professor of sociology in 1957, remaining at Harvard until 1971. He had a research fellowship at the Center for Advanced Study in the Behavioral Sciences from 1955 to 1956.

In 1972 he was hired at Stanford University. There, he worked as senior fellow at the Hoover Institution and a professor of both sociology and education. He was the founding editor of the Annual Review of Sociology, which was first published in 1975. He remained editor through 1980, with Ralph H. Turner as acting editor in 1978.

== Awards and honors ==
Inkeles was recognized by membership in the American Academy of Arts and Sciences in 1962, the American Philosophical Society in 1972, and the National Academy of Sciences in 1981. In 1982 he received the Cooley-Mead Award from the American Sociological Association.

== Personal life and death ==
He was married to Bernadette née Kane. They met when he was at Cornell and submitted short stories to the literary magazine of which she was editor, though she rejected many of his stories. They married after their graduation from Cornell and remained married until her death in 2005. They had one daughter together. He enjoyed traveling and viewing the visual and dramatic arts of different cultures. He died in Palo Alto, California on July 9, 2010, at the age of 90.
