= Open Access Publishing in European Networks Foundation =

Open access organisation

The Open Access Publishing in European Networks Foundation (OAPEN) is a non-profit organisation that supports open-access publishing of peer-reviewed scholarly books, particularly in the humanities and social sciences. The foundation provides infrastructure for hosting, dissemination, and the long-term preservation of open-access monographs and edited collections. It is a founding member of the European research infrastructure OPERAS, serving as the national node for the Netherlands. It is based in the National Library at The Hague, Netherlands. Its current director is Niels Stern.

== Establishment ==
OAPEN began as a co-funded European Union project, under the EU's eContentplus programme, which aimed to improve the access and use of digital content across Europe. The original OAPEN project, which ran from 2008 to 2011, aimed to explore and promote sustainable models for open access monograph publishing in Europe. After the project's conclusion, the OAPEN Foundation was created as an independent, non-profit organisation under Dutch law, to continue this work and to provide a permanent infrastructure for OA books

== Projects ==
- The OAPEN Library: A global digital library for hosting and disseminating scholarly OA books, free to use, no registration required.
- Directory of Open Access Books (DOAB): A free global discovery service developed in partnership with OpenEdition to index peer-reviewed OA books
- OAPEN Open Access (OA) Books Toolkit: A free resource intended to help authors to better understand open access book publishing and to increase trust in open access books.

== Partnerships ==
OAPEN has a number of partnerships in the fields of research and scholarly communications across Europe, including:

- Austrian Science Fund
- Knowledge Unlatched
- Swiss National Science Foundation
- Dutch Research Council
- Open Book Collective
- German Research Foundation
- UK Research and Innovation
- CERN
