= Wayne Yokoyama =

American biologist

- Education: University of Rochester; University of Hawaiʻi at Mānoa
- Scientific career
- Fields: Biology
- Workplaces: Washington University in St. Louis

Wayne Yokoyama is an American biologist, currently the Sam J. Levin and Audrey Loew Levin Professor at Washington University in St. Louis and an Elected Fellow of the American Association for the Advancement of Science.

In 2007, he became an elected member of the National Academy of Science and became director of the Medical Scientist Training Program at Washington University School of Medicine. He became a co-editor of the Annual Review of Immunology in 2013.

== Early life and education ==
Born in Maui, Hawaii, Yokoyama earned his undergraduate degree from the University of Rochester and his medical degree from the University of Hawaiʻi.
