= Penelope Curtis =

British art historian and curator

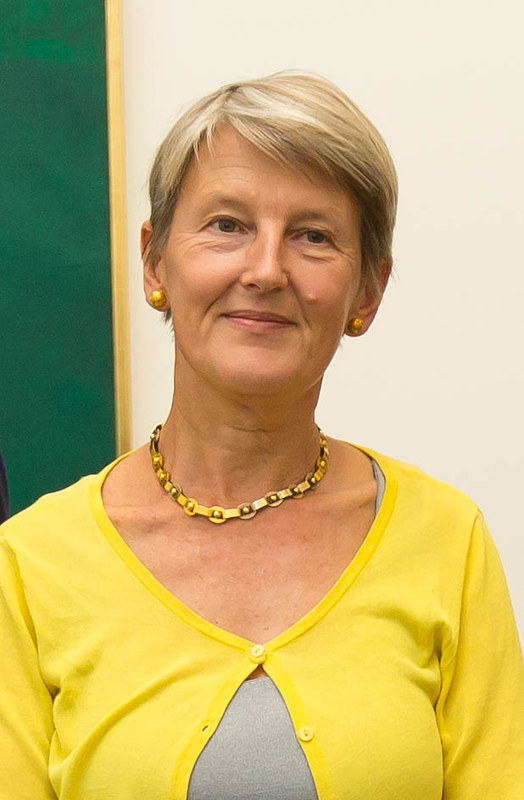
- Born: 1961 (age 64–65); London, England
- Education: Oxford University
- Occupations: Curator and writer
- Known for: leading Tate Britain
- Parent(s): Adam S. G. Curtis, Ann Curtis
- Honours: Aspects of Art Lecture (2016)

Penelope Curtis (born 1961) is a British art historian and curator. From 2015 to 2020 she was the director of Lisbon's Museu Calouste Gulbenkian, and from 2010 to 2015 director of Tate Britain. She is the author of several monographs on sculpture and has written widely at the invitation of contemporary artists.

== Early life ==
Curtis was born in 1961. Her family moved from London in 1967 when her father Adam S. G. Curtis became Professor of Cell Biology at Glasgow University. She studied Modern History at Corpus Christi College, Oxford University from 1979 until 1982. Curtis completed an MA in Modern European Art at the Courtauld Institute of Art where she later gained a PhD on monumental sculpture in Third Republic France after two years' research in Paris.

== Career ==
In 1988, Curtis became exhibitions curator at the new Tate Liverpool. In 1994, she became Head of the Henry Moore Centre for the Study of Sculpture at Leeds City Art Gallery. In 1999 she took on the leadership of the newly created Henry Moore Institute and devised an innovative programme combining collections, research and exhibitions. i. Here, Curtis notably supervised the development of the archive collections of sculptors' papers as well as the acquisition of significant works by Rodin, Epstein and Calder, among many others. As well as presenting solo shows of contemporary artists the Institute became known for thematic exhibitions examining material and cultural histories, including 'Bronze', 'The Colour of Sculpture', 'Depth of Field' and 'Wonder'. Curtis also confronted sculpture's links with Fascism in two exhibitions: 'Taking Positions' and 'Scultura Lingua Morta'.

Curtis left the Henry Moore Foundation in 2010 to take on the direction of Tate Britain. She worked with architects Caruso St John on the Millbank project and oversaw the acclaimed new hang, entitled a 'Walk through British Art', and the related Spotlight galleries, each with a different focus on the collection. Other exhibitions drawing on the collection included 'Migrations', 'Kenneth Clark', 'Artist & Empire' and 'Queer British Art'. As Director of Tate Britain Curtis was chair of the Jury of the Turner Prize. She has also served on the Advisory Committee for the Government Art Collection, the Art Commissions Committee for the Imperial War Museum and the Faculty of the British School at Rome. She recently completed two terms as a member of the Conseil d'Administration of the Rodin Museum in Paris. She is on the advisory board of the Museo d'arte della Svizzera italiana and of the Sculpture Journal.

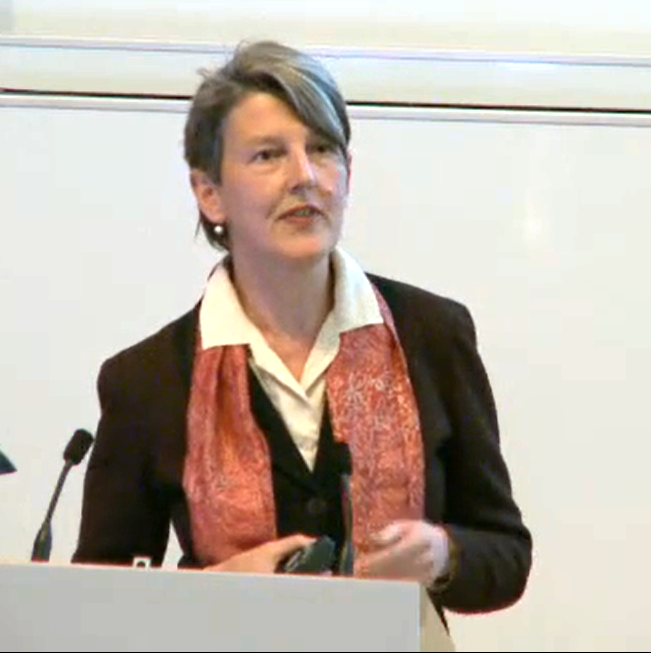
Curtis presenting at the Said Business School in 2011

In March 2015, Curtis announced that she would leave London's Tate Britain to take up an invitation to create one museum from the amalgamation of the Calouste Gulbenkian Museum with the Modern Art Centre. As the first non-Portuguese Director of the Calouste Gulbenkian Museum she worked to increase its international profile, while creating dialogues between the Middle Eastern collections, contemporary artists, and new audiences. .

Commenting on her reasons for moving to Lisbon, Curtis said that she was attracted by the 'Gulbenkian's exceptional architecture, landscaped setting and museography', which led to her exhibition and catalogue 'Art on Display' (2019). (The Gulbenkian Museum has eleven curators and around half a million visitors a year. Its smaller scale than the Tate makes it easier to effect changes, even if the Gulbenkian Foundation occupies an almost governmental position within Portuguese society. The amalgamation of the two museums vastly increased the numbers going to the ex-Centro de Arte Moderna and helped with cross-fertilisation.)

Responding to the fact that a small number of male art critics took against her in London, Curtis commented that 'Nick Serota and other people saw it as misogyny'. Tate Britain has also suffered in general from priority being given to Tate Modern.

Curtis used her time in Lisbon to appoint a curator of the Middle Eastern Collections and to integrate works from Syria, Jordan and Turkey with works from Western Europe in a new "crossings gallery". She also programmed 'The Rise of Islamic Art' to deal with the founder's close interaction with the rise of the oil industry. Curtis noted that even this small new gallery would be a significant change for the museum which was founded in 1969 and changed little thereafter. Contemporary shows have also been curated in and with the founder's collection, and other 'Conversation' exhibitions have sought to open up new dialogues. Curtis noted that with an annual acquisitions budget of 500,000 Euros for the acquisition of new art it would be necessary for the museum to concentrate primarily on Portuguese art and to place it within a wider context. This has meant looking also at Portugal's colonial links and wider diaspora.

Curtis concluded her term as director in 2020. and in the spring of 2021, took up the Edmund J. Safra Visiting Professorship at the Center for Advanced Study in the Visual Arts, National Gallery of Art in order to develop her research into the crossovers between sculpture and architecture in the later 20th century.

Curtis has a particular interest in inter-war art and architecture and contemporary art, on which she has written widely. She is a regular speaker, delivering the 2015 Paul Mellon Lectures at the National Gallery and Yale (published 2017 by Yale) and has also spoken at the Metropolitan Museum, the Guggenheim and at universities in the UK and abroad.

In 2024, Penelope Curtis started a new career as a literary writer. She published her debut novel After Nora with London-based publisher Les Fugitives. The follow-up, Villa Wintrebert, is set to be released on 3 July 2026, still with Les Fugitives.

== Honours and awards ==
- Balsdon Fellow, British School at Rome, June to August 2003
- Museum Fellow, J. Paul Getty Museum, Los Angeles, June to August 2007
- Paul Mellon Lectures, National Gallery, London and Yale University, January and April 2015
- Honoris causa, University of York, 2018
- Honorary Fellow, Corpus Christi College, Oxford, 2018
- Officier, Ordre des Arts et des Lettres, France, 2019
- Edmund J. Safra Visiting professor, Center for Advanced Study in the Visual Arts, Washington, February to May, 2021.

== Bibliography ==
- Dynamism—The Art of Modern Life Before the Great War, 1991, Tate Gallery.
- Bernard Meadows, Sculpture and Drawings, 1995, Henry Moore Foundation
- Sculpture 1900-1945, 1999, Oxford University Press.
- Lucia Nogueira: Drawings, 2005, Drawing Room.
- Figuring Space: Sculpture/Furniture from Mies to Moore (co-authored), 2007, Henry Moore Sculpture Trust.
- Patio & Pavilion: The Place of Sculpture in Modern Architecture, 2007, Ridinghouse/Getty.
- Towards a New Laocoon (co-authored), 2007, Henry Moore Institute.
- Sculpture in Painting: The Representation of Sculpture in Painting from Titian to the Present (co-authored), 2009, Henry Moore Institute.
- Sculpture Vertical, Horizontal, Closed, Open, 2017, Yale University Press.
- Modern British Sculpture (co-authored with Keith Wilson), 2011, Royal Academy Books.
- Tate Britain Companion: A Guide to British Art (editor), 2013, Tate Publishing.
- The Human Factor: Uses of the Figure in Contemporary Sculpture (co-authored), 2014, Hayward Gallery Publishing.
- After Nora, 2024, Les Fugitives.
- Villa Wintrebert, 2026, Les Fugitives.
