= Annual Review of Sociology =

- Discipline: Sociology
- Language: English
- Edited by: Douglas Massey; Mary C. Waters

Publication details
- History: 1975–present, 51 years old
- Publisher: Annual Reviews (US)
- Frequency: Annually
- Open access: Subscribe to Open
- Impact factor: 8.4 (2025)

Standard abbreviations
- ISO 4: Annu. Rev. Sociol.

Indexing
- CODEN: ARVSDB
- ISSN: 0360-0572 (print); 1545-2115 (web)
- LCCN: 75648500
- JSTOR: 03600572
- OCLC no.: 2244366

Links
- Journal homepage

The Annual Review of Sociology is an annual peer-reviewed review journal published by Annual Reviews (AR) since 1975. As of 2023, it is being published as open access, under the Subscribe to Open model. It is abstracted and indexed in the Social Sciences Citation Index. As of 2026, Journal Citation Reports gives the journal a 2025 impact factor of 8.4, ranking it first out of 222 journals in the category "Sociology".

== History ==
In 1969, a joint panel including sociologists from the National Academy of Sciences and the Social Science Research Council made a formal recommendation for the creation of an annual journal that published review articles about sociology. As a result of the recommendation, the American Sociological Association initiated a collaborative agreement for the creation of such a journal with Annual Reviews (AR), a nonprofit organization whose stated mission is to synthesize knowledge "for the progress of science and the benefit of society." The Annual Review of Sociology was first published in 1975, making it the twentieth AR journal title. Additionally, it was AR's third title in the social sciences, following publication of the Annual Review of Psychology in 1950 and the Annual Review of Anthropology in 1972. In 1996 it was published electronically for the first time, making it the first of the twenty-six AR titles published online. As of 2020, it was published both in print and electronically.

== Scope and indexing ==
The journal defines its scope as covering significant developments in sociology, regarding theoretical and methodological applications, as well as subfields like social processes, institutions and organizations, culture, political sociology, economic sociology, social stratification, demography, urban sociology, social policy, historical sociology, and sociology in various regions of the world. Most volumes include a prefatory chapter written by a distinguished sociologist in which they reflect on their career and achievements. It is abstracted and indexed in Scopus, IBZ Online, International Bibliography of the Social Sciences, and Academic Search, among others.

== Editorial processes ==
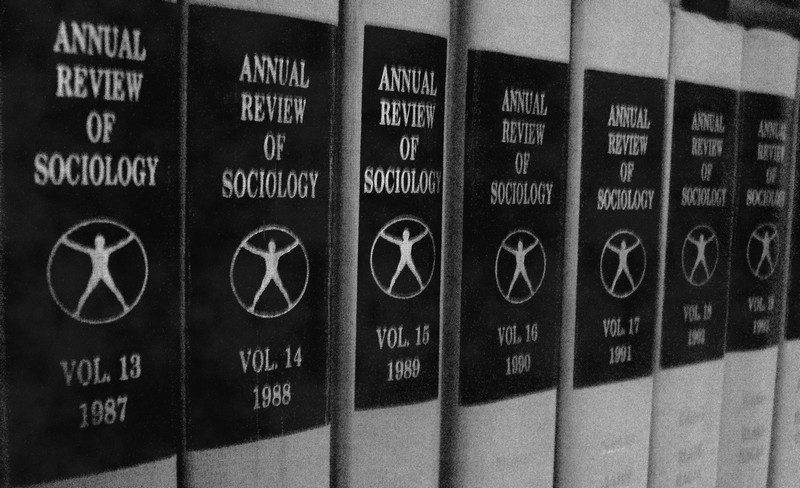
Collection of Annual Review of Sociology volumes at Human and Social Sciences Library Paris Descartes-CNRS

The Annual Review of Sociology is helmed by the editor or the co-editors. The editor is assisted by the editorial committee, which includes associate editors, regular members, and occasionally guest editors. Guest members participate at the invitation of the editor, and serve terms of one year. All other members of the editorial committee are appointed by the AR board of directors and serve five-year terms. The editorial committee determines which topics should be included in each volume and solicits reviews from qualified authors. Unsolicited manuscripts are not accepted. Peer review of accepted manuscripts is undertaken by the editorial committee.

=== Editors of volumes ===
Dates indicate publication years in which someone was credited as a lead editor or co-editor of a journal volume. The planning process for a volume begins well before the volume appears, so appointment to the position of lead editor generally occurred prior to the first year shown here. An editor who has retired or died may be credited as a lead editor of a volume that they helped to plan, even if it is published after their retirement or death.

- Alex Inkeles (1975–1977; 1979–1980)
- Ralph H. Turner (1978; 1981–1986)
- William Richard Scott (1987–1991)
- Judith Blake (1992–1993)
- John L. Hagan (1994–1997)
- Hagan and Karen S. Cook (1998–2004)
- Cook and Douglas Massey (2005–2023)
- Massey and Mary C. Waters (August 2023–present).

== See also ==
- List of sociology journals
