= CEU Press =

Academic publisher in Budapest and NYC

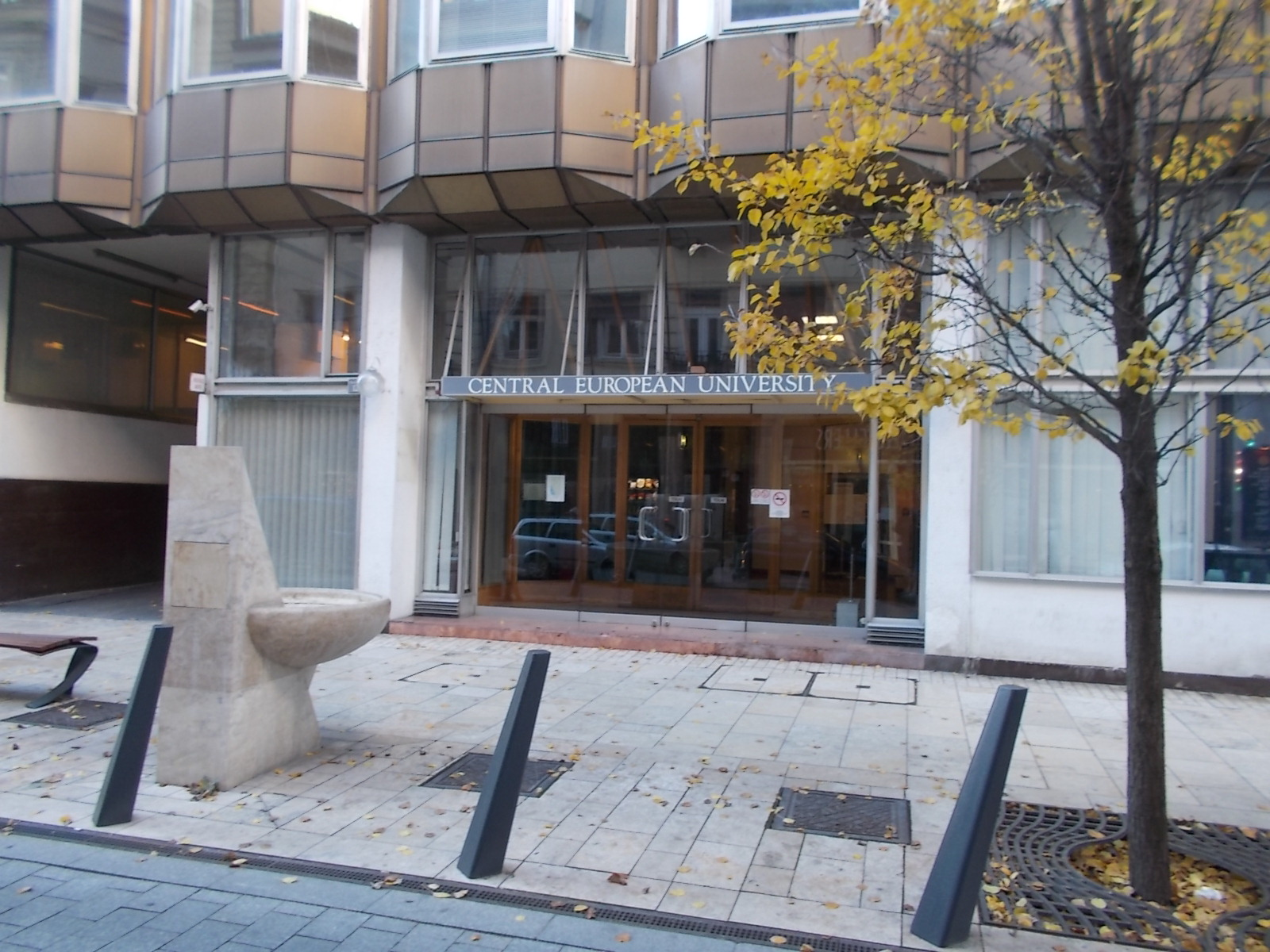
- Status: Active
- Founded: 1993; 33 years ago
- Founder: George Soros
- Country of origin: United States, Hungary
- Headquarters location: 1051 Budapest, Oktober 6 utca 14, Hungary; 400 West 59th Street, New York, NY 10019, USA
- Publication types: Books
- Fiction genres: Academic publishing
- Owner: Central European University
- Official website: www.ceupress.com

The Central European University Press, commonly known as the CEU Press, abbreviated as CEUP, is an academic publisher with close connections to the Central European University. It is located in Budapest and New York City.

== Overview ==
The CEU Press was established in 1993, following the establishment of the Central European University in 1991. Its language of publication is English. As of 2024, the CEU Press has 470 books available on JSTOR.

The main topics of the CEU Press include political philosophy, open society, history, jurisprudence, nationalism studies, human rights, conflict resolution, gender studies, Jewish studies, economics, medieval studies, literature, and international relations.

Originally, the regional focus of the CEU Press was the Central and Eastern Europe. Later, it expanded to the former Soviet Union countries and their neighbors, as well as the Arab and Islamic worlds. The CEU Press publishes the CEU Review of Books.

Since 2020, Frances Pinter has been the executive chair of the Press in Budapest, Hungary. Emily Poznanski took over as head of CEU Press in February 2021.

In 2020, the CEU Press announced that it is transitioning to an open access monograph programme through its new library subscription membership initiative, Opening the Future. In 2022, CEU Press announced that nine University of California campuses have signed up through the California Digital Library to their Opening the Future collective funding programs and would receive unlimited, perpetual access to curated selections of the CEU Press' backlists.

The CEU Press is a member of the Association of European University Presses and Association of University Presses. It is working with the Community-led Open Publication Infrastructures for Monographs project.

== See also ==
- Blinken Open Society Archives
