= Tracey Meares =

American law professor

Tracey L. Meares
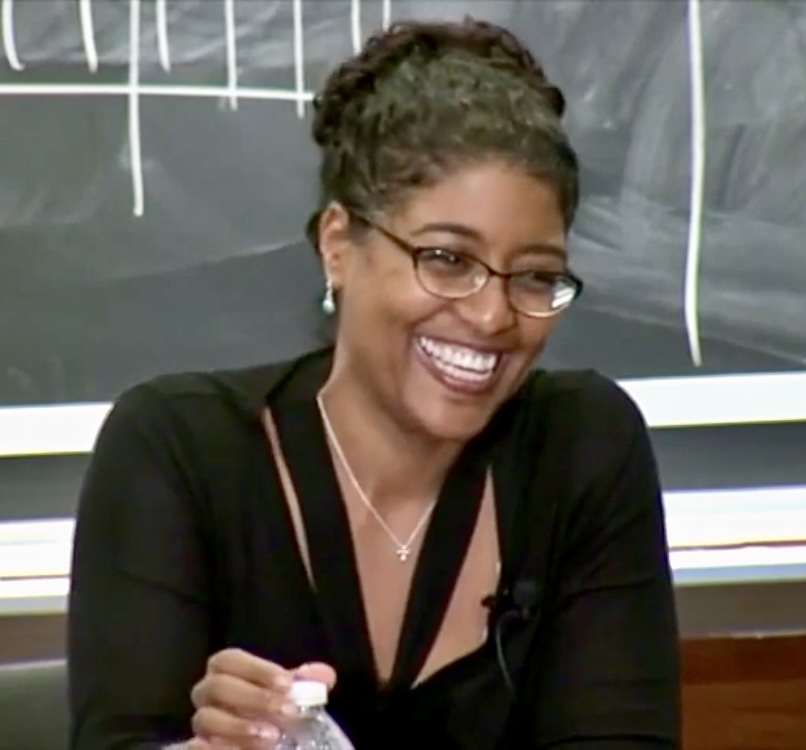
- Meares in 2015
- Occupations: Legal scholar, author

Academic background
- Education: University of Illinois at Urbana–Champaign (B.S.); University of Chicago Law School (J.D.)

Academic work
- Institutions: Yale Law School; University of Chicago Law School
- Main interests: criminal procedure and criminal law policy
- Notable works: The coming crisis of criminal procedure, 1998.

Tracey L. Meares is an American legal scholar and author. She is the Walton Hale Hamilton Professor of Law at Yale Law School. Previous to joining the Yale Law School faculty, she was Max Pam Professor of Law and Director of the Center for Studies in Criminal Justice at the University of Chicago Law School. At both Chicago and Yale, she was the first African-American woman to be granted tenure.

== Early life and education ==
Meares was born to Robert and Carolyn Blackwell, who still live in Springfield, Illinois. Meares attended and graduated from a high school in the Springfield Public School District 186 in 1984 as one of two "Top Student"(s). In 2022, she was named the valedictorian, a delay that she attributes to racism. Meares holds a B.S. in general engineering from the University of Illinois in 1988, and a J.D. from the University of Chicago Law School in 1991.

== Career ==
Meares' first positions included a stint clerking for Harlington Wood, Jr. when he was on the United States Court of Appeals for the Seventh Circuit, as well as a position at the United States Department of Justice's Antitrust Division, where she was a trial attorney. She taught at the University of Chicago Law School from 1995 to 2007, after which she joined Yale Law School as the Walton Hale Hamilton Professor of Law, a position she has held ever since. She also served as Yale Law School's Deputy Dean from 2009 to 2011 and co-founded The Justice Collaboratory along with Tom Tyler. As of 2021, she is a co-editor of the Annual Review of Criminology.

== Awards and positions ==
Meares has been a member of the National Research Council's Committee on Law and Justice, and was appointed by then-Attorney General Eric Holder to serve on the Office of Justice Programs' Science Advisory Board. She is also a member of the Joyce Foundation's Board of Directors. In 2014, then-President Barack Obama appointed her to the President's Task Force on 21st Century Policing when he created it by signing an executive order. She was elected an American Academy of Arts and Sciences Fellow in 2019.
