= Ann Shumelda Okerson =

American librarian

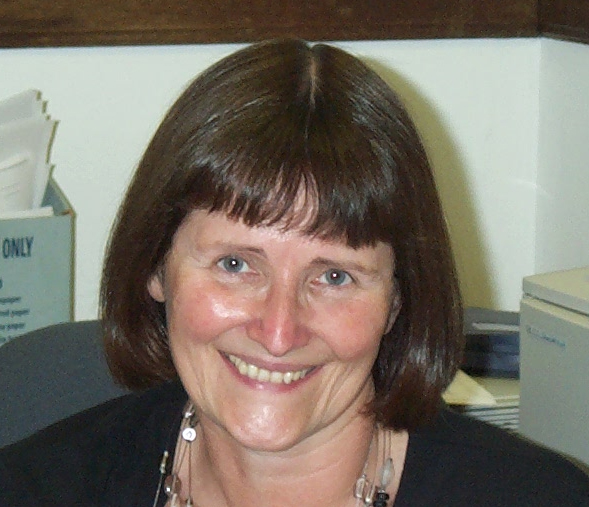
- Born: 1950; Austria
- Citizenship: American
- Education: Pacific Union College; University of California, Berkeley
- Occupation: Librarian
- Employer(s): Center for Research Libraries; Yale University Library

Ann Shumelda Okerson (born c. 1950) is an American librarian and expert on the licensing of electronic resources and the place of digital technologies in academic and research libraries.

== Life and education ==
Okerson was born in Austria circa 1950 and moved to the United States when she was six years old. Her family lived in Chicago before moving to Los Angeles and then San Francisco in the late 1950s. She studied English and German literature at Pacific Union College and taught high school before studying for a doctorate in English literature at the University of California, Berkeley. Inspired by friends who were librarians, she switched to UC Berkeley's library science program and earned her MLS. For more details see https://aokerson.yolasite.com/.

== Career ==
After graduation, Okerson worked at Simon Fraser University in Canada, Blackwell's in the United Kingdom, and an antiquarian bookseller in the United States before becoming director of the Office of Scientific and Academic Publishing at the Association of Research Libraries in 1990. She joined Yale University Library six years later. She served as Associate University Librarian at Yale University for fifteen years.

At Yale, in 1996, she organized and for fifteen years ran the Northeast Research Libraries consortium (NERL), a group of thirty large research libraries (and over 100 smaller affiliates) that negotiates licenses for electronic information and engages in other forms of cooperative activity. This consortium continues to operate under the umbrella of CRL. In her capacity as NERL leader, Okerson was a founding member of the International Coalition of Library Consortia, an informal group of library consortia from around the world.

Okerson served as Senior Advisor on Electronic Strategies for the Center for Research Libraries 2011-2021. She has made major contributions to understanding of serials pricing, electronic journals, licensing of electronic resources, and consortial purchasing of electronic materials. She has been a leader in international projects to build a Middle Eastern digital library and has worked broadly with libraries in this and other regions.

Long involved with the International Federation of Library Associations and Institutions (IFLA), she has served in leadership roles in the Serials, Acquisitions, and News Media sections, and also three terms on IFLA's governing board, including as Chair of the Professional Committee. In 2021, she received the IFLA Scroll of Appreciation in recognition of her service (https://www.ifla.org/ifla-scroll-of-appreciation/).

Other activities include being a principal investigator on several cutting-edge grants, including two U.S. Department of Education Title VI grants for building components of a Middle East Virtual Library, a National Endowment for the Humanities grant for digitization of Iraqi scholarly journals, and a foundation grant for improving liberal arts teaching through use of library special collections. Okerson has served on external advisory boards for a number of organizations, including both the Library of Alexandria and the Library of Congress. She has served as a trainer for INASP and in the past has contributed as an advisor and trainer for the eIFL project.

From 1997 to 2001, with funding from the Council on Library and Information Resources (CLIR), she and the Yale Library staff mounted an online educational resource about library licensing of electronic content in a project called LIBLICENSE. Its extensive annotations and links are complemented by Liblicense-l, an international, moderated online discussion list to which some 5,500 librarians, publishers, attorneys, students and other interested individuals subscribe. In 1998, Okerson secured an additional grant that created the Liblicense software, which enables users to generate a customized license using standard language options. In April 2001, the Digital Library Federation endorsed the project's work on a Model Electronic License for academic research libraries. This model license has since been revised, adapted, and used by many libraries, consortia, and publishers. The entire LIBLICENSE project moved in 2012 to CRL, which continues actively to support it. The software was completely re-written in 2015.

As of September 22, 2025, the Charleston Hub, which organizes the Charleston Conference, announced that the mail group and archive Liblicense-l would join its platform of resources.

== Publications ==
Her articles on serials pricing (1987), on copyright (1992), and on publishing done in libraries (2016) won American Library Association awards for Best Article in the area of serials, acquisitions, and/or collections, in 1987, 1993, and 2016. ALA named her Serials Librarian of the year in 1993. In 1999, she was named the winner of ALA's LITA/High Tech award.

In 1992, she wrote the synopsis chapter of the Andrew W. Mellon Foundation study University Libraries and Scholarly Communication. Also at ARL, she created and published five editions of the standard Directory of Electronic Journals, Newsletters and Academic Discussion Lists (1991–1995). She organized and led four electronic networked publishing symposia (organized on behalf of the ARL and the Association of American University Presses) and edited three volumes of proceedings from those symposia. With James J. O'Donnell, then at the University of Pennsylvania, she edited Scholarly Journals at the Crossroads: A Subversive Proposal for Electronic Journal Publishing (ARL, June 1995), representing an extensive multi-national Internet discussion across many e-lists about the future of scholarly journals.
