= Adam S. G. Curtis =

British cell biologist

- Born: 3 January 1934; London
- Died: 8 August 2017 (aged 83)
- Education: University of Cambridge; University of Edinburgh
- Spouse: Ann Curtis
- Children: 2, including Penelope Curtis
- Scientific career
- Workplaces: University College London; Glasgow University
- Thesis: Some biophysical studies of developmental processes (1957)
- Doctoral advisors: C. H. Waddington, Geoffrey G. Selman
- Notable students: Cheryll Tickle; Richard B. Gallagher

Adam Sebastian Genevieve Curtis (3 January 1934 – 8 August 2017) was a British cell biologist who researched cell adhesion and contact inhibition. He worked at the University of Glasgow from 1967 until he became a professor emeritus in 2004. He was president of the Society for Experimental Biology from 1993 to 1995 and an elected fellow of the Royal Society of Edinburgh and Royal Society of Biology.

== Early life and education ==
Adam Sebastian Genevieve Curtis was born on 3 January 1934 in London, at the South London Hospital for Women and Children. His father, Herbert Lewis Curtis, was an architect who served in World War I by surveying aerial photographs. His mother, Nora Patricia née Stevens was born in Ireland and studied painting at Slade School of Fine Art.

He initially planned on studying geology and applied to King's College and University of Cambridge. He decided to attend Cambridge and study biology instead of geology. He attended the University of Edinburgh for his PhD, studying in its Institute of Animal Genetics under advisors C. H. Waddington and Geoffrey Selman. He then returned to London to complete a post-doctoral research appointment with Michael Abercrombie, where he researched contact inhibition, the mechanisms by which cells stop moving upon contact with another body.

== Career ==
In 1962, he became a lecturer of zoology at University College London. In 1967, he began working in the newly established Department of Cell Biology at the University of Glasgow, where he thus became the first professor of cell biology in the UK. In 1997, he was a co-founder of the Centre for Cell Engineering at the University of Glasgow along with Chris Wilkinson. He also helped found the Tissue and Cell Engineering Society UK and served as its president from 2001 to 2003.

Curtis's observations of cell movement across a surface lead to novel experimentation with using nanovibrations to direct the behavior of stem cells, which was called "nanokicking". In 2004 he retired, becoming a professor emeritus. Some of the doctoral students that he advised included Cheryll Tickle and Richard B. Gallagher.

== Awards and honours ==
In 1972 he was awarded the Cuvier Medal by the Zoological Society of France. He was an elected fellow of the Royal Society of Edinburgh, the Royal Society of Biology, and of Biomaterials Science and Engineering. He served as the president of the Society for Experimental Biology from 1993 to 1995.

== Personal life and death ==
He married Ann Curtis in 1958; they had met at the University of Edinburgh. They had two daughters together, Penelope Curtis and Susanna. He died on 8 August 2017.
