= James J. O'Donnell =

American academic (b.1950)

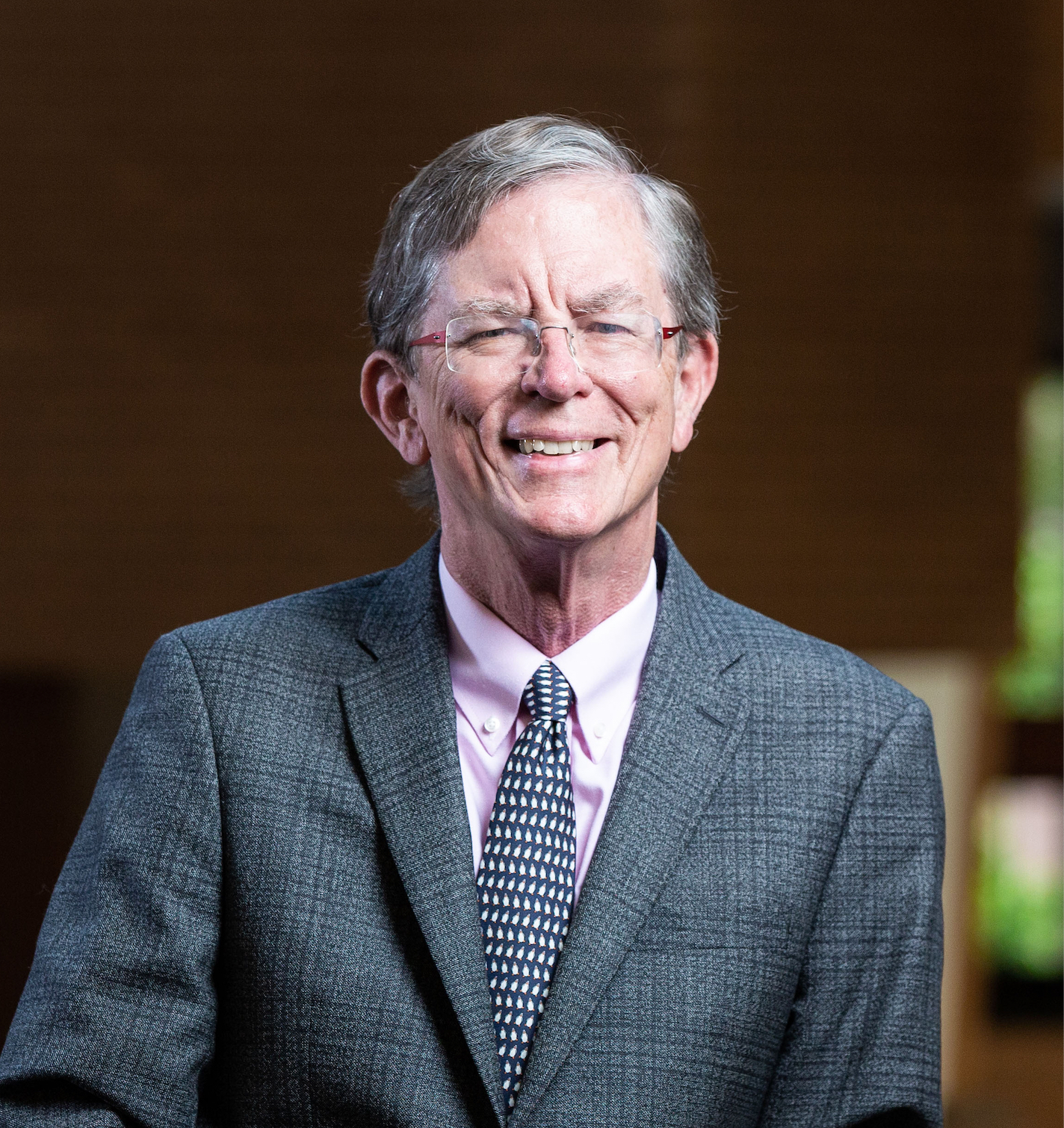
James O'Donnell -- ASU portrait

James Joseph O'Donnell (born 1950) is a classical scholar and University Librarian at Arizona State University. He formerly served as University Professor at Georgetown University (2012–2015) and as Provost of Georgetown University (2002–2012). O'Donnell was previously Vice Provost for Information Systems and Computing at the University of Pennsylvania (1996–2002). He is a former President of the American Philological Association (the national learned society for academics who work on the ancient world) and a Fellow of the Medieval Academy of America. From 2012 to 2018, he chaired the Board of the American Council of Learned Societies.

O'Donnell writes and lectures on topics of the late Roman Empire, Augustine of Hippo, and also on the impact of information technology in the modern academic and cultural world. He was an early adopter of the World Wide Web for academic collaboration within the humanities. He co-founded and has been involved with Bryn Mawr Classical Review since it was founded in 1990. In 1994, he offered the first Internet massive open online course (MOOC) when 500 students around the world participated (through gopher and email) in his University of Pennsylvania seminar on the life and work of St. Augustine.

== Books ==
O'Donnell's books and scholarly articles include technical works on history and philosophy, with a special interest in Augustine of Hippo, and he has also written five books that are addressed to a general audience. Avatars of the Word (Harvard University Press 1998) outlines the history of writing and media from ancient Greek times to the present, while Augustine: A New Biography (HarperCollins, 2005) was widely reviewed (e.g., The New Republic, The Economist, The New York Times). An account of the end of Roman grandeur, The Ruin of the Roman Empire (HarperCollins, 2008), was widely praised. His Pagans was published in 2015. His latest book, a new translation of Julius Caesar's commentaries on the Gallic Wars, came out in 2019.

- Cassiodorus (1979) University of California Press; ISBN 978-0520036468
- Scholarly Journals at the Crossroads: A Subversive Proposal for Electronic Publishing (edited, with Ann Shumelda Okerson) (1995) Association of Research Libraries; ISBN 0-918006-26-0
- Avatars of the Word: From Papyrus to Cyberspace (1998) Harvard University Press; ISBN 0-674-05545-4
- Augustine: A New Biography (2005) Ecco Press; ISBN 0-06-053537-7
- The Ruin of the Roman Empire: A New History (2008) Ecco Press; ISBN 0-06-078737-6
- Pagans (2015) Ecco Press; ISBN 0-06-184535-3
- The War for Gaul: A New Translation (2019) Princeton University Press; ISBN 0-69-117492-X

== Education ==
- 1972 A. B. Princeton University
- 1975 Ph.D. Yale University
- 1999 L.H.D. (honorary) Saint Michael's College

== Esoterica ==
O'Donnell's website includes a biographical sketch of Doughbelly Price. Price was a cowboy turned real estate agent in Taos, New Mexico. The biography includes a profile from Life in 1949 and feature audio clips of old cowboy songs by Price. In 2023, Nighthawk Press of Taos reprinted The Wisdom and Insanity of Doughbelly Price with a preface by O'Donnell.

The 2007 edition of the Edge - the third culture Annual Question O'Donnell offered positive words on humanity: "we turn out to be a stubbornly smart, resilient and persistent species, and we do not forget the most important things."
