= Karen Cook (sociologist) =

American sociologist

Karen S. Cook
- Born: July 25, 1946 (age 80); Austin, Texas
- Education: Stanford University
- Awards: Cooley-Mead Award (2004)
- Scientific career
- Fields: Sociology
- Workplaces: University of Washington, Duke University, Stanford University

Karen Schweers Cook (born July 25, 1946, in Austin, Texas) is an American sociologist and the Ray Lyman Wilbur Professor of Sociology at Stanford University.

In 2004 Cook received the Cooley-Mead Award for Distinguished Scholarship from the American Sociological Association. In 2007 Cook was elected as a fellow of the American Association for the Advancement of Science for her work on social exchange theory, social networks and trust.

== Education ==
Karen Cook attended Stanford University, and spent two semesters at Harlaxton Manor in the English Midlands as part of the Stanford in Britain program. She received her B.A. with honors (1968), M.A. (1970), and Ph.D. (1973) in Sociology from Stanford.

== Career ==
From 1972 to 1995, Cook was a professor of sociology at the University of Washington (UW) in Seattle, Washington. She was promoted from acting assistant professor to become a full professor in 1985, and served as chair of the UW sociology department for 1993–1995. There she collaborated with Richard Marc Emerson and developed the first computer-based laboratory for the study of social exchange.

From 1995 to 1998 Cook was the James B. Duke Professor of Sociology and director of the Laboratory for Social Research at Duke University.

Cook joined the faculty of Stanford University in 1998 as the Ray Lyman Wilbur Professor of Sociology. Cook was the founding director of the Institute for Research in the Social Sciences (IRiSS), which was formed at Stanford in 2004. She also served as senior associate dean for the social sciences from 2001 to 2005, and as chair of the sociology department from 2005 to 2010. Cook has served in the Stanford University Faculty Senate as a senator (2005–2007), a member of the senate steering committee (2006–2008) and as chair of the senate (2008–2009). In 2010 Cook was appointed as the vice provost for faculty development and diversity (VPFDD) at Stanford, serving in the role until September 30, 2019.

Cook has been elected to the American Academy of Arts and Sciences (1996), the American Association for the Advancement of Science (2007), and the National Academy of Sciences (2007). She was elected to the American Philosophical Society in 2018.

Cook is a past president of the Pacific Sociological Association (1990–1991) and a former vice president of the International Institute of Sociology (1992–1993) and the American Sociological Association (1994–1995). She was named to the Russell Sage Foundation Board of Trustees in 2012.

She has edited or co-edited a number of books in the Russell Sage Foundation Trust Series including Trust in Society (2001), Trust and Distrust in Organizations: Emerging Perspectives (2004), eTrust: Forming Relations in the Online World (2009), and Whom Can Your Trust? (2009). She is a co-author of Cooperation without Trust? (2005). Cook is a co-editor of the Annual Review of Sociology. She is also a co-chair of the Annual Reviews Board of Directors.

Cook received the Cooley-Mead Award for Distinguished Scholarship from the American Sociological Association in 2004.
