= Samuel Gubins =

U.S. economist

- Born: 1942 (age 82–83)
- Education: Reed College (B.A.); Johns Hopkins University (PhD)
- Spouse: Eleanor Bush Gubins
- Awards: Fellow of the American Academy of Arts and Sciences; Fellow of the American Association for the Advancement of Science
- Scientific career
- Institutions: Haverford College (1968–1981); Academy of Natural Sciences in Philadelphia (1981–1995); Annual Reviews (1995–2015)
- Thesis: The impact of age and education on the effectiveness of training: a benefit-cost analysis

Samuel Gubins (born 1942) is an American economist. He held leadership roles at the Academy of Natural Sciences in Philadelphia from 1981 to 1995 and the nonprofit academic publisher Annual Reviews from 1995 to 2015. He is an elected Fellow of the American Academy of Arts and Sciences and the American Association for the Advancement of Science.

== Education ==
Samuel Gubins attended Reed College where he graduated with a B.A. in 1964. He graduated with a PhD from Johns Hopkins University in economics in 1970.

== Career ==
From 1968–1981, he was assistant professor of economics at Haverford College. He was also vice president for finance at Haverford. He was senior vice president at the Academy of Natural Sciences in Philadelphia from 1981–1995. In 1995, Gubins became president and editor-in-chief of the nonprofit publishing company Annual Reviews, a position he held until 2015 when he was succeeded by Richard Gallagher. During his tenure at Annual Reviews, it added new journal titles in 20 subjects, going from 26 to 46 journals. He also oversaw the electronic publishing of the journals for the first time, starting with the Annual Review of Sociology and the Annual Review of Medicine. He remains on the board of Annual Reviews as of 2020. He has served on the board of directors of the Society for Industrial and Applied Mathematics since 1982.

== Honors ==
In 2008, Gubins was elected a Fellow of both the American Academy of Arts and Sciences and the American Association for the Advancement of Science.

== Personal life ==
His wife is Eleanor Bush Gubins, who was an assistant professor of economics and political science at Rosemont College.
