= Frederick P. Morgeson =

American industrial and organizational psychologist

- Education: Eastern Michigan University; Purdue University
- Scientific career
- Institutions: Texas A&M University; Michigan State University

Frederick Phillip Morgeson is an industrial and organizational psychologist at Michigan State University, where he is the Eli Broad Professor of Management in the Broad College of Business. He is the editor of the Annual Review of Organizational Psychology and Organizational Behavior and an elected fellow of the Academy of Management, American Psychological Association, Association for Psychological Science, and Society for Industrial and Organizational Psychology.

== Education ==
Frederick Phillip Morgeson attended Eastern Michigan University, receiving a bachelor's of science degree, with a major in psychology and a minor in philosophy. He also received a master's degree in general experimental psychology from Eastern Michigan University. In 1998, he graduated from Purdue University with a PhD in industrial and organizational psychology.

== Career ==
From 1998 to 2000 he worked at Texas A&M University as an assistant professor. He joined Michigan State University in 2000 as an assistant professor. He was promoted to associate professor in 2003 and promoted to professor in 2007 and named the Valade Research Scholar. In 2013 he was named the Eli Broad Professor of Management.

Morgeson studies how organizations can optimally identify, select, develop, manage, and retain talent to achieve their strategic goals. He was the editor of Personnel Psychology from 2010 to 2013. In 2011 he became the founding editor of the Annual Review of Organizational Psychology and Organizational Behavior.

== Awards and honors ==
In 2008 he was elected as a fellow of the Society for Industrial and Organizational Psychology and the American Psychological Association. The following year, he was elected as a fellow of the Association for Psychological Science. He was an elected fellow of the Academy of Management in 2018.
