= Naomi Leonard =

American mechanical and aerospace engineer

- Born: 1963 (age 62–63)
- Education: Princeton University, University of Maryland
- Awards: MacArthur Fellows Program
- Scientific career
- Fields: Electrical engineering, Mechanical engineering
- Workplaces: Princeton University

Naomi Ehrich Leonard (born 1963) is the Edwin S. Wilsey Professor of Mechanical and Aerospace Engineering at Princeton University. She is the director of the Princeton Council on Science and Technology and an associated faculty member in the Program in Applied & Computational Mathematics, Princeton Neuroscience Institute, and the Program in Quantitative and Computational Biology. She is the founding editor of the Annual Review of Control, Robotics, and Autonomous Systems.

== Life ==
Leonard graduated from Princeton University with a B.S.E. degree in mechanical engineering in 1985. From 1985 to 1989, she worked in the electric power industry. She graduated from the University of Maryland with a M.S. in 1991 and Ph.D. in 1994, in electrical engineering, under the supervision of P. S. Krishnaprasad. She Joined Princeton's faculty as an assistant professor of Mechanical and Aerospace Engineering in 1994.

== Research ==
Leonard's research is in the area of dynamics and control theory. Her early work involved the development of "energy-shaping" methods of feedback control for single vehicles. It has applications to the control theory of more general mechanical systems. She later expanded her work to the control of multi-agent systems, with an emphasis on collective sensing, decision-making, and motion. Her work includes the study of multi-agent systems in nature and the application of insights from nature to man-made systems.

Many of Leonard's projects have involved the control of aquatic vehicles. She operates the underwater robotic tank lab at Princeton. She has worked for a number of years with the Autonomous Ocean Sampling Network. In 2006, she led the Adaptive Sampling and Prediction project, which used 10 underwater vehicles to form an automated and adaptive ocean observing system in Monterey Bay.

In developing algorithms for robot control, she integrates physics and fluid mechanics with research about uncertainty and collective decision-making. She draws upon nature for her models, studying the animal flocking behavior of fish, honeybees, and birds. Her autonomous robotic swarms mimic schools of fish and are used to collect data and explore their marine environment. Naomi also collaborated with dance professor Susan Marshall to integrate the intricate movement patterns of fish schools and bird flocks into choreography.

== Awards ==
- 1995 National Science Foundation CAREER Award
- 2004 MacArthur Fellows Program
- 2007 IEEE Fellow
- 2011 ASME Fellow
- 2012 Fellow of the Society for Industrial and Applied Mathematics
- 2013 Elected to the American Academy of Arts and Sciences
- 2014 Fellow of the International Federation of Automatic Control
- 2026 ASME Rufus Oldenburger Medal
