= Iain Stevenson =

Iain Stevenson (1950/1951-died March 2017) was emeritus professor of publishing at University College London. He founded the environmental publishers, Belhaven Press.

== Career ==
Stevenson's first career was in commercial publishing where he worked for Longman, Macmillan, Wiley, and the Stationery Office. He later moved into academia and in 1981 obtained his PhD from the University of London for a thesis titled "Viticulture and society in the Herault (France) during the Phylloxera Crisis, 1862-1907". He was professor of publishing studies at City University, London and later professor and emeritus professor of publishing at University College London.

He founded the environmental publishers Belhaven Press. In 2010, the British Library published his history of British publishing, Book Makers: British Publishing in the Twentieth Century.

== Death ==
In March 2017, Stevenson was hit by a car in Bishops Stortford, Hertfordshire, while walking down the street. He was taken to hospital but died from his injuries, aged reportedly 66.

== Selected publications ==
- Canadian Election Postal Stationery. Postal Stationery Society, Sutton Veny, 2003.
- Book Makers: British Publishing in the Twentieth Century. British Library Publishing, London, 2010. ISBN 9780712309615
