= Avery August =

Belizean-born American scientist (born 1964)

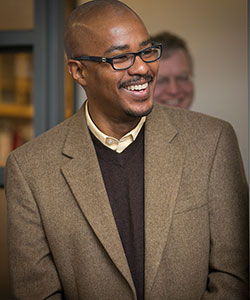
- Born: 28 January 1964 (age 62); Belize City, Belize
- Education: Weill Cornell Graduate School of Medical Sciences (PhD); California State University, Los Angeles (BS)
- Scientific career
- Fields: Immunology; T cells
- Workplaces: Cornell University Department of Microbiology and Immunology; Penn State University Distinguished Professor of Immunology }}

Avery August (born January 28, 1964) is a Belizean-born American scientist who is currently a professor of immunology and vice provost at Cornell University.

== Education ==
Avery August was born in Belize City, Belize. August attended government primary schools, and subsequently attended St. Michael's College for Boys (as High Schools in Belize are called), where he earned a High School Diploma. Following one year at the Belize Technical College, he emigrated with his family to Los Angeles, California. There he attended California State University, Los Angeles, where he earned a B.S. degree in Medical Technology. While at California State University, he got involved in undergraduate research in the laboratory of Phoebe Dea, then Professor of Chemistry & Biochemistry at California State University (see Scientific Career below for details). This first exposure to research pushed him to attend graduate school at Cornell University's Weill Graduate School of Medical Sciences in New York City. There he worked at the Sloan Kettering Institute (an institute within the Memorial Sloan Kettering Cancer Center) with Immunologist Bo Dupont, and where he earned his PhD in immunology. He then gained post-doctoral experience at The Rockefeller University, working with virologist and National Academy of Science member, Hidesaburo Hanafusa.

== Scientific career ==
August first worked in the catalytic synthesis of fatty acids, and other lipids as an undergraduate student in Prof. Dea's laboratory at California State University, Los Angeles. This work resulted in the publication of methods to easily catalyze the insertion of deuterium into unsaturated fatty acids, which could then be used as probes of membrane structure. Then, he became interested in immunology as he described in a recent interview with Stephanie Houston of Journal of Experimental Medicine.

Upon moving to Cornell University, August initiated work on his PhD thesis, to understand the molecular basis of activation of T cells. T cells are major players in regulating the development of an immune response. The importance of these cells is illustrated by the fact that the virus HIV infects helper T cells, and thus disables effective immunity against the virus, resulting in Acquired Immune Deficiency Syndrome or AIDS.

August joined the laboratory of Bo Dupont at the Sloan-Kettering Research Institute for Cancer Research and worked on unraveling the molecular basis for T cell co-stimulation by the cell surface protein CD28. This work resulted in 9 publications (see references at PubMed). This work also led to the production of his PhD thesis entitled "On the molecular basis of the two signal hypothesis of T cell activation: Signaling by CD3 and CD28" from Weill Cornell Graduate School of Medical Sciences of Cornell University.

Following graduation, August joined the Laboratory of Molecular Oncology at Rockefeller University, headed by Hidesaburo Hanafusa. At The Rockefeller, August worked on a number of areas, including analysis of the BRCA1 oncogene that when mutated, results in a much increased risk for breast cancer. This work was the first to show that this protein could regulate the transcription of genes and could potentially regulate the development of Breast cancer in this fashion. He also continued working on analysis of the regulation of Tec family kinases, work which he had started as a PhD student and was the first to show that this family of kinases is regulated by upstream signals from Src and PI3-kinase. This work had direct implications for manipulating T cell activation and thus the immune response. August joined Pennsylvania State University in 1999 as an assistant professor. There he became distinguished professor of immunology and director of Center of the Molecular Immunology and Infectious Disease. Subsequently, he moved to the Cornell University College of Veterinary Medicine, where he is a professor at the Department of Microbiology & Immunology, Howard Hughes Medical Institutes-HHMI Professor, and also the vice provost for academic affairs.

== Honors and awards ==
August was awarded the Ruth Kirschstein Diversity in Science award in 2016 for his contributions to breaking down barriers for historically marginalized scientists and to the field of biochemistry and molecular biology.

In 2018, August was selected to become an HHMI professor for his work with undergraduate researchers. Specifically, he developed a three-stage program to support students that are transferring from community colleges. The stages include a summer research experience, faculty mentoring and peer mentoring.
