= Annual Review of Criminology =

- Discipline: Criminology
- Language: English
- Edited by: Tracey L. Meares; Robert J. Sampson

Publication details
- History: 2018–present
- Publisher: Annual Reviews (US)
- Frequency: Annually
- Open access: Subscribe to Open
- Impact factor: 7.1 (2025)

Standard abbreviations
- ISO 4: Annu. Rev. Criminol.

Indexing
- ISSN: 2572-4568

Links
- Journal homepage

The Annual Review of Criminology is a peer-reviewed academic journal published by Annual Reviews (AR), a nonprofit organization whose stated mission is to synthesize knowledge "for the progress of science and the benefit of society." The journal was established in 2018 and covers the field of criminology. Its founding co-editors were Joan Petersilia and Robert J. Sampson. As of 2021, the co-editors are Tracey L. Meares and Sampson. As of 2023, Annual Review of Criminology is being published as open access, under the Subscribe to Open model. As of 2026, Journal Citation Reports gives the journal an impact factor of 7.1, ranking it first of 113 journal titles in the category Criminology & Penology.

== Abstracting and indexing ==
The journal is abstracted and indexed in Scopus and the Social Sciences Citation Index.
