= Katina Strauch =

American librarian (born 1946)

- Born: December 24, 1946; Columbia
- Education: University of North Carolina at Chapel Hill
- Occupation: Library scientist
- Employer: College of Charleston

Katina P. Strauch (born 1946) is a librarian, now retired, at the College of Charleston in Charleston, South Carolina. She is the founder and convener of the Charleston Conference, a national-level conference for libraries, librarians, and publishers. She has published extensively on librarianship, and is a co-editor of the Charleston Conference Proceedings, and a founding co-editor of Against the Grain, a periodical on topics in librarianship. Strauch has served on the National Museum and Library Services Board, which advises the Institute of Museum and Library Services.

== Early life and education ==
Katina Maria Parthemos was born in Columbia, South Carolina to James and Helen Parthemos. Her father was an academic, and the family moved frequently while she was a child. She has married twice, becoming known as Katina Walser in 1969, and Katina Strauch on her marriage to Bruce Strauch in 1977.

Katina attended the University of North Carolina, Chapel Hill, majoring in economics and working in the library as a student. She received her Bachelor of Arts in economics as Katina Maria Parthemos in 1969. She then attended library school at Chapel Hill, receiving her Masters in Science in Library Science as Katina Parthemos Walser in 1973.

== Career ==
=== Librarianship ===
After graduating, she became a librarian in the Nursing School of Duke University. While there, she wrote a Guide to library resources in nursing (1980) by Katina P. Strauch and Dorothy J. Brundage. The guide was named one of the outstanding reference books of 1980 by the Association of College and Research Libraries (ACRL)'s Choice magazine.

Having decided to relocate to Charleston, Katina Strauch joined the College of Charleston in 1979, as head of acquisitions for the Robert Scott Small Library in Charleston, South Carolina. Nearing retirement in 2018, she was head of collection development and assistant dean for technical services at the College's Addlestone Library.

Strauch has served on the National Museum and Library Services Board, which advises the Institute of Museum and Library Services.

=== Charleston Conference ===
In 1980, unable to afford to attend the American Library Association's Annual conference, Strauch organized the first Charleston Conference for librarians. The conference now draws an international audience of academic libraries, librarians, and publishers. It was attended by nearly 3,000 people in 2021.

In 2015, the conference was described as "so well-established, really something of an institution in the library world, that it is difficult to imagine a time when it did not yet exist."

=== Writing and editing ===
Strauch has published extensively on librarianship, collections management, and related issues. Her edited books include Legal and ethical issues in acquisitions (1990) Collection assessment: a look at the RLG conspectus (1992) and Theories of bibliographic education (1982).

Strauch is a founding co-editor of Against the Grain, a periodical dealing with topics in librarianship, which was started in 1989. Strauch was instrumental in establishing The Charleston Advisor in 1999, a quarterly publication to review web products for information professionals. Strauch became a co-editor of the Charleston Conference Proceedings in 2001.

A new digital publication, Katina Magazine, was launched to succeed The Charleston Advisor as of November 12, 2024. It is named in honor of Katina Strauch.

== Awards and honors ==
- 1997, HARRASSOWITZ Award for Leadership in Library Acquisitions, HARRASSOWITZ Company.
- 2007, Louis Shores-Greenwood Publishing Group Award, from the Reference and User Services Association (RUSA), a division of the American Library Association (ALA),

== Selected publications ==
- Strauch, Katina (January 1, 1983). "Issues in book and serial acquisitions: Collection development in the eighties: The LAPT report". Library Acquisitions: Practice & Theory. 7 (3): 213–214. doi:10.1016/0364-6408(83)90017-0. ISSN 0364-6408.
- Strauch, Katina; Strauch, Bruce, eds. (1990). Legal and ethical issues in acquisitions. New York, N.Y: Haworth Press. ISBN 1560240075.
- Strauch, Katina (March 15, 2017). "Charleston Conference". In McDonald, John D.; Levine-Clark, Michael (eds.). Encyclopedia of Library and Information Sciences. CRC Press. pp. 794–805. ISBN 978-1-000-03154-6.
