= Knowable en español =

Nonprofit magazine for science communication

- Editor: Debbie Ponchner
- Categories: Popular science, science journalism
- Frequency: Weekly
- Publisher: Annual Reviews
- First issue: October 2022
- Country: United States
- Language: Spanish
- Website: es.knowablemagazine.org
- ISSN: 2833-7697

Knowable en español is a Spanish-language non-profit, editorially independent online publication from science publisher Annual Reviews. Launched October 13, 2022, under editor Debbie Ponchner, Knowable en español features both original pieces reported and published first in Spanish and translations of English-language articles from its sister publication Knowable Magazine. Knowable en español discusses scientific discoveries and the significance of scholarly work in a journalistic style. The magazine uses information from Annual Reviews' 51 review journals as springboards for stories from areas including health and disease, the environment, biology, physics, the social sciences, and economics, linking back to science-related scholarly sources.

Knowable en español has been supported by grants from the Gordon and Betty Moore Foundation and the Howard Hughes Medical Institute (HHMI).

== Awards ==
- 2024, Honorable mention, Science Single Article (Consumer) category, Folio: Eddie and Ozzie Awards, for "The extraordinary case of the ferocious female moles" by Alejandra Manjarrez; translated by Debbie Ponchner, published first in Spanish, then English.
- 2025, National Academies of Sciences, Engineering and Medicine Eric and Wendy Schmidt Award for Excellence in Science Communications, for work that included "Nature interrupted: Impact of the US-Mexico border wall on wildlife" by Iván Carrillo; translated by Debbie Ponchner, published first in Spanish, then English.

== Availability ==
Knowable en español is available to read online without a subscription or other fees. The articles in the magazine are published under a CC BY-ND copyright license allowing republication but prohibiting derivative works.

Articles from Knowable en español have been republished internationally in media such as El País, Spain; La Nación, Argentina; La Nación, Costa Rica; El Espectador, Colombia; El Universal, México, and Salud con Lupa, Perú.
