= Katina Magazine =

Nonprofit, mission-driven magazine for librarianship

- Editor-in-chief: Curtis Brundy
- Categories: Librarianship
- Frequency: Weekly
- Publisher: Annual Reviews
- Founded: November 12, 2024
- First issue: 2025
- Country: United States
- Language: English
- Website: katinamagazine.org

Katina Magazine is a digital publication about library and information science, for librarians and others in the library industry. It is a successor to The Charleston Advisor and is named after the Charleston Conference's original founder, Katina Strauch. Katina Magazine was launched as of November 12, 2024 by Annual Reviews (AR), a nonprofit organization that synthesizes knowledge "for the progress of science and the benefit of society". As of May 13, 2025, Curtis Brundy, from the University of Massachusetts Amherst, was named editor-in-chief of Katina Magazine.

== Content ==
Katina Magazine is a digital publication about library and information science, for librarians, publishers, and technology providers. Material in Katina Magazine is grouped into three editorial sections relevant to the library and information science communities— Resource Advisor (originally named Resource Reviews), Open Knowledge, and The Future of Work. Topics addressed include library leadership, professional development, open access, pricing models, resources and products, the use of artificial intelligence, and the changing roles of libraries and librarians nationally and internationally. During its first publication year, Katina Magazine published 140 articles, written by 180 authors in 25 countries.

== Availability ==
Beginning with the 2026 subscription year, Katina Magazine is available to read online without a subscription or other fees. The articles in the magazine are published as open access, through the Subscribe to Open model, under a CC BY-NC Creative Commons license prohibiting derivative works.
