= Knowable Magazine =

Nonprofit, mission-driven magazine for science communication

- Editor: Eva Emerson, Rosie Mestel (English); Debbie Ponchner (Spanish)
- Categories: Popular science, science journalism
- Frequency: Weekly
- Publisher: Annual Reviews
- First issue: October 2017
- Country: United States
- Language: English
- Website: knowablemagazine.org
- ISSN: 2575-4459

Knowable Magazine is a non-profit, editorially independent online publication from science publisher Annual Reviews that discusses scientific discoveries and the significance of scholarly work in a journalistic style. The magazine uses information from Annual Reviews' 51 review journals as springboards for stories from areas including health and disease, the environment, biology, physics, the social sciences, and economics, linking back to science-related scholarly sources. The publication aims "to create a bridge between popular science articles and the technical literature".

Knowable often uses comics and infographics to enhance storytelling and make complex concepts easier to understand. Knowable Magazine makes many of its science graphics freely available online, for use by scientists and educators. In 2025, Knowable offered a free "Teen Brain Bootcamp" for people working with teens, reviewing research into adolescent brain development.

As a non-profit publication, Knowable Magazine has been supported by grants from the Gordon and Betty Moore Foundation, the Alfred P. Sloan Foundation. the Dana Foundation. and the Howard Hughes Medical Institute (HHMI). As of October 13, 2022, the initiative was expanded to include a Spanish-language sister publication, Knowable en español, under editor Debbie Ponchner.

== Awards ==
Launched in October 2017, Knowable Magazine was Folio magazine's 2018 Ozzie Award Winner for "Design, New Magazine" in the category "Consumer / Custom" and an Honoree for the 2020 Webby Awards. It was a winner or honorable mention in multiple categories of the Folio Eddie and Ozzie Awards for 2018, 2019, 2020, 2021, 2022, 2023, and 2024. The Knowable Magazine podcast won the Eddie category for podcast in Science & Technology in 2022 and for Science in 2024.

In 2021, Jessica Seigel won the Newswomen's Club of New York's Front Page Award for Specialized Reporting in Science/Technology for The truth about lying. In 2023, Ute Eberle was the Short Form Print Winner in the Acoustical Society of America's Science Communications Awards for the Knowable article Life in the soil was thought to be silent. What if it isn’t? In 2024, Katarina Zimmer won the Eddie & Ozzie Award for Range of Work by a Single Author, Consumer. In 2025, Victoria Uwemedimo and Katarina Zimmer won the Best of Solutions Journalism in Multimedia award from the Solutions Journalism Network with "For climate and livelihoods, Africa bets big on solar mini-grids." In 2025, Iván Carrillo received a National Academies of Sciences, Engineering and Medicine Eric and Wendy Schmidt Award for Excellence in Science Communications, for work that included the Knowable article Nature interrupted: Impact of the US-Mexico border wall on wildlife. Richard Stone's article The pernicious infections infiltrating Ukraine’s front lines was included in the Pulitzer Center's 'A Year in Stories' for 2025. In 2026, Amber Dance won the June Roth Memorial Award for Outstanding Medical Journalism from the American Society of Journalists and Authors for How cancer cells travel to new tissues and take hold.

Awards that Knowable Magazine has received for its articles also include the 2020 Jonathan Eberhart Planetary Sciences Journalism Award for distinguished popular writing from the American Astronomical Society (2020), Best Shortform Science Writing awards (2020, 2019, 2018), and Best Online Articles & Essays from Entropy Magazine (2018). The journalists writing for Knowable Magazine include former Knight Science Journalism fellows.

== Availability ==
Knowable Magazine is available to read online without a subscription or other fees. The articles in the magazine are published under a CC BY-ND copyright license, allowing republication but prohibiting derivative works. Many of Knowable Magazine's science graphics have been made freely available online at Flickr for use by scientists and educators.

Major national and international publications including The Atlantic, PBS NewsHour, Scientific American, Smithsonian, Discover, the BBC, The Washington Post and Ars Technica have republished articles from Knowable Magazine. Articles originally from Knowable en español have been republished in media such as El País, Spain; La Nación, Argentina; La Nación, Costa Rica; El Espectador, Colombia; El Universal, México, and Salud con Lupa, Perú.
