= Donna Farber =

Columbia University Professor and Chief of Surgical Sciences

- Education: University of Michigan; UC Santa Barbara
- Awards: 2019 AAAS Fellow
- Scientific career
- Fields: Immunology; organ transplant
- Workplaces: University of Maryland; Columbia University

Donna L. Farber is the Chief of Surgical Sciences, George H. Humphreys, II Professor of Surgical Sciences, and Professor of Microbiology and Immunology at Columbia University. Her research focuses on transplant immunology and memory T-cells.

== Education and career ==
Farber received her B.S. in microbiology from the University of Michigan in 1984 and her Ph.D. in biochemistry and molecular biology from the University of California Santa Barbara in 1990. She did postdoctoral research at Yale University and at the Pasteur Institute in Paris, France.

== Career ==
She joined the faculty at the University of Maryland in 1996. In 2010, she moved to Columbia University.

In 2019, she was elected as a fellow of the American Association for the Advancement of Science.
