= Annual Review of Control, Robotics, and Autonomous Systems =

- Language: English
- Edited by: Naomi Ehrich Leonard

Publication details
- History: 2018; 8 years ago
- Publisher: Annual Reviews (US)
- Frequency: Annually
- Open access: Subscribe to Open
- Impact factor: 14.6 (2025)

Standard abbreviations
- ISO 4: Annu. Rev. Control Robot. Auton. Syst.

Indexing
- ISSN: 2573-5144

Links
- Journal homepage

The Annual Review of Control, Robotics, and Autonomous Systems is an annual peer-reviewed scientific journal published by Annual Reviews (AR). In publication since 2018, the journal covers developments in the engineering of autonomous and semiautonomous systems through an annual volume of review articles. It is edited by Naomi Ehrich Leonard. As of 2023, Annual Review of Control, Robotics, and Autonomous Systems is being published as open access, under the Subscribe to Open model. As of 2026, Journal Citation Reports gives the journal an impact factor of 14.6 for the year 2025, ranking it second of 88 journal titles in the category "Automation and Control Systems" and third of 48 journal titles in the category "Robotics".

== History ==
In 2018, the Annual Review of Control, Robotics, and Autonomous Systems became the 49th title published by Annual Reviews (AR), a nonprofit organization whose stated mission is to synthesize knowledge "for the progress of science and the benefit of society." The journal's founding editor was Naomi Ehrich Leonard.

== Abstracting and indexing ==
It is abstracted and indexed in the Science Citation Index Expanded and Inspec.

== Editorial processes ==
The journal is helmed by the editor or the co-editors. The editor is assisted by the editorial committee, which includes associate editors, regular members, and occasionally guest editors. Guest members participate at the invitation of the editor, and serve terms of one year. All other members of the editorial committee are appointed by the AR board of directors and serve five-year terms. The editorial committee determines which topics should be included in each volume and solicits reviews from qualified authors. Unsolicited manuscripts are not accepted. Peer review of invited manuscripts is undertaken by the editorial committee.
