= Pinter Publishers =

British publishing company

- Status: Defunct
- Founded: 1973
- Founder: Frances Pinter
- Successor: Cassell & Co (1995-1999); Continuum International Publishing Group (1999-2012); Bloomsbury Publishing (2012-present)
- Country of origin: United Kingdom
- Publication types: Books
- Nonfiction topics: Social sciences

Pinter Publishers was a British publishing company set up in 1973 by Frances Pinter, at the age of 23. It focused on the social sciences and is believed to be the first British publishing company owned by a woman.

Pinter Publishers earned a reputation for its willingness to take on works that other publishers considered too risky or radical. Many of these books went on to become seminal texts: helping to push forward debates and enabling new disciplines. The company grew into one of the UK's major specialist Social Science publishers, with exports accounting for over 80% of its sales.

== Growth ==
In 1986 Pinter Publishers founded the Belhaven Press imprint, one of the first to concentrate solely on environmental matters, and covered subject areas from Geography, Planning, Urban Studies, Climatology, Development, Biology, Ecology, Geology and Agriculture. It published over 200 titles.

In 1986 it acquired Leicester University Press, specialising in the Humanities. Belhaven Press was sold to John Wiley & Sons in 1993 and Pinter Publishers was itself disposed to Cassell in 1995. Cassell's academic and religious lists (including Pinter) were merged with American company Continuum to form the Continuum International Publishing Group in 1999. Continuum was taken over by Bloomsbury Publishing in 2011 and absorbed into it in 2012.

Frances Pinter’s commitment to enabling thoughtful, informed debate about some of the most important questions facing contemporary society, and her talent for identifying cutting edge authors and texts, helped her to develop a reputation for making courageous decisions as publisher. Pinter Publishers took on books that broke new ground, began new conversations and, in some cases, established new fields. The first field in which Pinter Publishers became an acknowledged leader was International Relations. By 1979 it had become a known innovator: introducing a whole genre of books examining the social and economic impacts of new technologies. It also had strong lists in development, human rights and linguistics.

In 1979 Frances Pinter began a close connection with the Science Policy Research Unit at Sussex University, publishing a number of books by its director Christopher Freeman and backing a new generation of scholars, many of whom went on to highly successful academic careers, including Luc Soete, Giovanni Dosi, Rod Coombs and Luke Georghiou amongst many others. Schumperterian economics and open innovation were important themes in much of this work.

== Examples of notable books ==
- Testing monetarism (Meghnad Desai, 1981)
- The International politics of deterrence (Barry Buzan, 1987)
- States and markets (Susan Strange, 1988)
- Technical change and economic theory (ed. Giovanni Dosi, 1988)
- Small countries facing the technological revolution (eds. Christopher Freeman and Bengt-Åke Lundvall, 1988)
- New developments in systemic linguistics (Dr. Robin P Fawcett, David G Young, Et Fawcett, 1988)
