= Press Enterprise (Pennsylvania) =

Daily newspaper published in Bloomsburg, Pennsylvania

- Type: Daily newspaper
- Owner: Press Enterprise Inc.
- Founder(s): Paul R Eyerly Sr., Charles T. Vanderslice
- Publisher: Brad Bailey
- Editor: Peter Kendron
- Managing editor: Brian Smith
- Photo editor: Jimmy May
- Staff writers: Leon Bogdan, Susan Schwartz, M.J. Mahon, Drew Mumich, Delainey Muscato
- Language: English
- Headquarters: Bloomsburg, Pennsylvania, United States
- Website: pressenterpriseonline.com

The Press Enterprise is a daily newspaper published in Bloomsburg, Pennsylvania, United States. It is owned by the parent company Press Enterprise Inc. and run by the Eyerly family. The newspaper serves a wide area, including Columbia County and Montour County, along with sections of Northumberland and Luzerne counties. This includes the municipalities of Bloomsburg, Danville, Berwick, Benton, Millville, Catawissa and Elysburg.

== Circulation ==
As of 2001, the newspaper had a circulation of 21,000.
