= Annual Review of Organizational Psychology and Organizational Behavior =

- Discipline: industrial and organizational psychology, organizational behavior, human resource management
- Language: English
- Edited by: Frederick P. Morgeson

Publication details
- History: 2014–present
- Publisher: Annual Reviews (United States)
- Frequency: Annually
- Open access: Subscribe to Open
- Impact factor: 55.9 (2025)

Standard abbreviations
- ISO 4: Annu. Rev. Organ. Psychol. Organ. Behav.

Indexing
- ISSN: 2327-0608 (print); 2327-0616 (web)
- LCCN: 2013200667
- OCLC no.: 1116087312

Links
- Journal homepage

The Annual Review of Organizational Psychology and Organizational Behavior is an annual peer-reviewed academic journal published by Annual Reviews (AR). It publishes review articles relevant to the fields of industrial and organizational psychology, organizational behavior, and human resource management. It was established in 2014, with Frederick P. Morgeson as founding editor-in-chief. As of 2023, the journal is published open access, under the Subscribe to Open model. According to the 2026 Journal Citation Reports, the journal has a 2025 impact factor of 55.9, ranking it first of 115 titles in "Psychology, Applied" and first of 426 journal titles in the category "Management" .

== History ==
The journal was first published in 2014 by Annual Reviews (AR), a nonprofit organization whose stated mission is to synthesize knowledge "for the progress of science and the benefit of society." Frederick P. Morgeson was the journal's founding editor. Previously, review articles about industrial and organizational psychology, organizational behavior, and human resource management had appeared infrequently in AR's Annual Review of Psychology. Due to the large number of sub-disciplines that fall under the umbrella of psychology, it was decided to create a new psychology journal that focused on these areas. Though it was initially published in print, as of 2021 it is only published electronically.

== Abstracting and indexing ==
The journal is abstracted and indexed in PsycINFO, Scopus, and the Social Sciences Citation Index.
