= Scott Frickel =

American sociologist

Scott Frickel is an American sociologist, currently an associate professor at Brown University, previously a professor at Tulane University and Washington State University, where he was the Boeing Distinguished Professor of Environmental Sociology. He is also a published author, being both cited and collected by libraries.
