= Charleston Conference =

Annual library conference in South Carolina, US

- Discipline: Academic libraries and publishers

Publication details
- Publisher: Katina Strauch
- History: 1980–present
- Frequency: Annual
- Website: www.charleston-hub.com/the-charleston-conference/

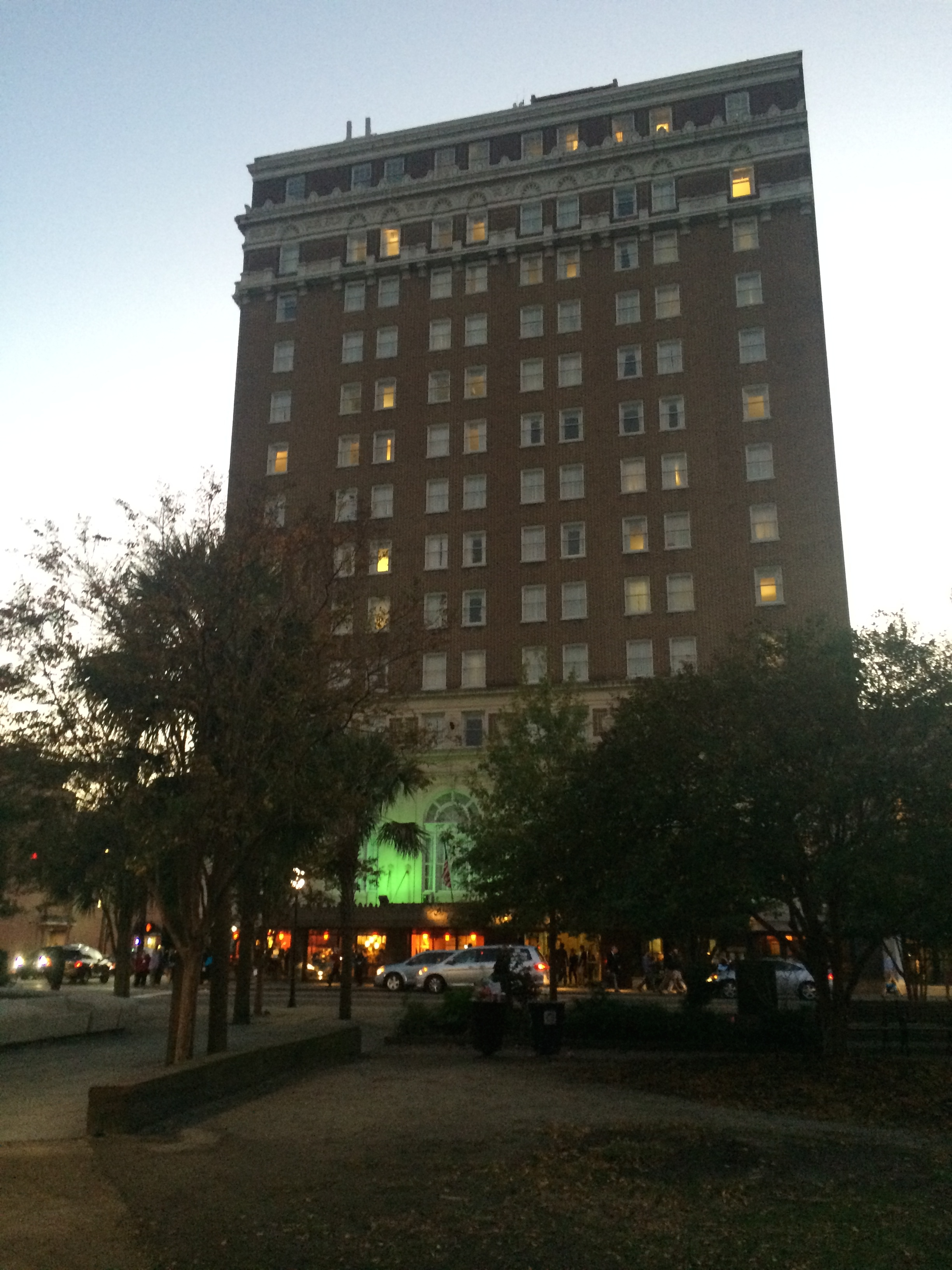
The Francis Marion Hotel, headquarters for the Charleston Conference

The Charleston Conference is an annual event for academic libraries, librarians, and publishers, held in Charleston, South Carolina, in the United States since 1980. It focuses on topics such as academic library acquisitions, serials, and library infrastructure and technology. In 2026, the Charleston Conference expanded to Asia, holding the first Charleston Conference Asia in Bangkok, Thailand.

== History ==
The conference was started in 1980 by Charleston librarian Katina Strauch, under the name "Issues in Book and Serials Acquisition". Strauch started the event after being unable to afford to attend the American Library Association's Annual conference. The first event was attended by two dozen librarians. In 1988, it was renamed the Charleston Conference. The conference was attended by 1,600 people in 2012 and nearly 3,000 in 2021.

The first Charleston Conference was held in collaboration with the College of Charleston’s Antiquarian Book Fair in a classroom at the college. As the conference grew, it moved to the college's Lightsey Conference Center in downtown Charleston. In the early 2000s, the conference moved to the Francis Marion Hotel, and in 2005 it expanded to multiple downtown venues including the Francis Marion Hotel, the Courtyard by Marriott Historic Charleston and the Charleston Gaillard Center.

As of 2023 the Charleston Hub, which organizes the Charleston Conference, was acquired by the nonprofit publisher Annual Reviews. As of September 22, 2025, the Charleston Hub announced that the mail group and archive Liblicense-l, originally founded by Ann Okerson at Yale, would join its platform of resources.

== Focus ==
The focus of the Charleston Conference is on acquisition for research and academic libraries, particularly serials and academic books. It also covers library infrastructure topics, such as vendor systems and library technology. The conference is one of the only major library conferences in the United States that is independent from a large professional or trade organization.

Each conference tends to have a focus topic, such as open access publishing or the impact of the COVID-19 pandemic on collections management. Presentations and discussions can address a broad range of issues that affect scholarly publishing and librarianship, including electronic collections, remote learning, diversity, equity, and inclusion initiatives, open research, publishers agreements, workflow technologies, data analytics, standards, copyright law, the U.S. government appropriations process, the impact of the White House Office of Science and Technology Policy (OSTP)'s 2022 Nelson Memo, intellectual freedom, disinformation, and legal challenges against libraries.

In 2026, the Charleston Conference expanded to Asia, holding its inaugural Charleston Conference Asia in Bangkok, Thailand from January 26 to 28, 2026. The conference theme was "Between Tides: Sailing the Open Seas", on scholarly communication.

== Publications ==
The conference is associated with the publication Against the Grain, which began as a newsletter for conference attendees in 1989. Against the Grain has become a periodical for librarians, dealing with a broad range of topics in librarianship including American copyright law.

As of 2000, the Conference published papers from the conference in the form of the Charleston Conference Proceedings. As of November 12, 2024, Annual Reviews launched a new digital publication on librarianship, called Katina Magazine in honor of Katina Strauch.
