= COPIM =

Community-led Open Publication Infrastructures for Monographs (COPIM)
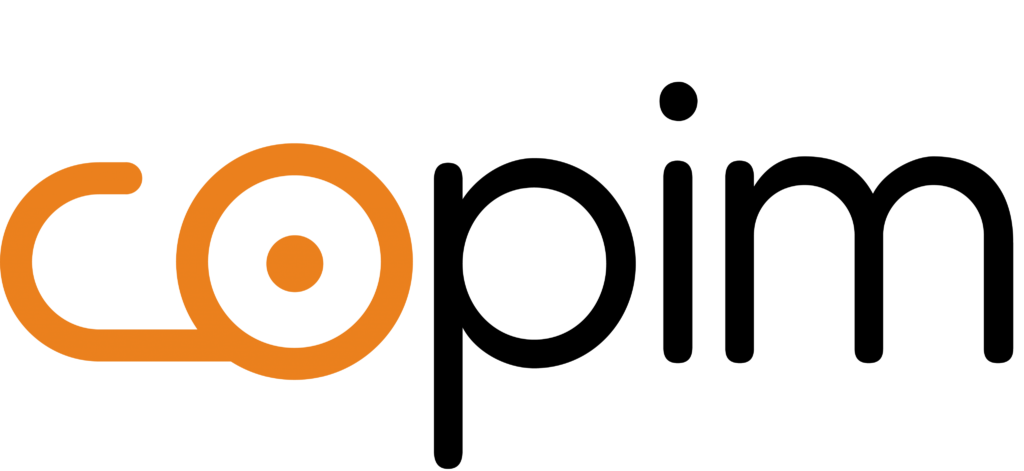
- Commercial?: No
- Type of project: International Partnership
- Established: 2019
- Launched: 2019-11
- Funding: £3.6M (£2,202,947 Research England, £800,000 Arcadia Fund, £576,537 partners’ own contributions) for the 1st project phase (2019-23); > £5.8M (£2,288,772.38 Research England, £2,858,000 Arcadia Fund, £736,011.91 partners’ own contributions) for the 2nd project phase (2023-2026).
- Website: copim.ac.uk

COPIM is an international collaboration involving researchers, universities, librarians, open-access book publishers and infrastructure providers. Established in 2019, it develops and supports infrastructure for open-access scholarly book publishing. Its activities have included the Community-Led Open Publication Infrastructures for Monographs (COPIM) project (2019-2023) and the Open Book Futures project (2023-2026). Both projects received funding from Research England and the Arcadia Fund.

The community takes its name is from the original COPIM project. Its approach, described as Scaling Small, emphasizes collaboration among smaller publishers and the development of non-profit, community-governed infrastructure for open access book publishing.

Copim has been named as a Supporting Action in UKRI's 2020 Open Access Review Consultation.

== Work Packages ==
In seven distinct Work Packages, the COPIM project explored:

- how to scope and build support for an integration of open access books in libraries;
- how to build a collective of librarians, publishers and researchers invested in sustainable OA through a not-for-profit, community-governed OA book revenue management and information exchange platform;
- how to establish funding models that enable a transition of legacy publishers' existing business models to non-BPC OA;
- research on, and implementation of robust governance models for not-for-profit, community-owned digital infrastructures such as those being developed in other work packages;
- channels of OA book discovery and dissemination, culminating in the development of an open-source OA book metadata creation and dissemination system and service;
- ways to more closely align existing software, tools and technologies, workflows and infrastructures for experimental publishing with the workflows of OA book publishers;
- how to establish more robust ways to tackle the technical and legal impediments to a more streamlined process of archiving and preservation of OA books technical and legal solutions.

At the end of the first project phase (04/2023), the list of key outputs, activities and proof-of-concepts delivered across the initial project's lifespan include:

- publication of 13 major scoping reports, 3 annual project reports, plus a variety of research papers published in peer-reviewed journals, the organisation and documentation of 26 workshops, with more than 220 national and international stakeholders representing 25 countries, and the presentation of COPIM work at more than 120 international conferences, workshops, and events.
- set-up an iterative extension of an Outreach and Dissemination network that is combining a variety of channels, including social media and open community platforms.
- following the platform's beta launch in 2021, the inception of Thoth, COPIM's Open Dissemination System, as a Community Interest Company under the name of Thoth Open Metadata CIC. Thoth now makes open access book metadata available in an open, transparent, and participatory way via its open API, and publishers can use the platform's interface to create rich, open metadata for direct dissemination in a variety of global channels.
- launch of the Open Book Collective platform and community of OA book publishers, infrastructure providers, and libraries that are collaborating to bring about a future for OA book publishing free from inequitable Book Processing Charges. The Open Book Collective has reached its initial revenue target, and has also implemented a robust legal, financial, and governance model to ensure longer-term stability of the Open Book Collective legal entity.
- further strengthening of the Opening the Future revenue model via the two publishers, CEU Press and Liverpool University Press, that COPIM has been working with. Through Opening the Future, both presses to date (04/2023) have released 15 new monographs between them, and have accrued enough funding through the programme for approximately 45 titles to be published OA in the coming months and years.
- launch of the Experimental Publishing Compendium, as a comprehensive online resource bringing together tools, practices, and books to promote and support the publication of experimental book publications.
- establishing the Thoth Archiving Network, a community-led collaboration between university repositories and national libraries to facilitate archiving and preservation of OA books via COPIM's Open Dissemination System Thoth, particularly those published by small and medium-sized publishers that might not have the resources to invest in other, more expensive means of archiving.

As part of the second project phase of Open Book Futures (OBF), the work package structure has been slightly adapted to accommodate the shift in focus towards accelerating the uptake of the proof-of-concepts that have been delivered during the first phase.

Open Book Futures supports already existing networks in UK and North America and engages with publishers, universities, and infrastructure providers in Africa, Australasia, Continental Europe, and Latin America to increase impact of COPIM and involve and encourage those that would shape the future of open access book publishing.

== Opening the Future ==
Opening the Future, a revenue model developed in COPIM's Business Models Work Package, is a collective subscription model through which subscribing libraries can get unlimited access to a selection of a chosen publisher's backlist, with perpetual access after three years. The generated membership revenue is used by the publisher solely to produce new Open access monographs.

The model is currently being piloted in collaboration with CEU Press and Liverpool University Press under the remit of COPIM.
