= Open-access monograph =

Monograph freely available with a creative commons license

An open-access monograph (open-access book or OA book) is a scholarly publication usually made openly available online with an open license. These books are freely accessible to the public, typically via the internet. They are part of the open access movement.

== Concept ==
Open access is when academic research is made freely available online for anyone to read and re-use. As with open access journals, there are different business models for funding open-access books, including publication charges, institutional support, library publishing, and consortium models. Some publishers, like OECD Publishing, uses a freemium model where the ebook version is made available for free, but readers have the option to purchase a print copy. Sales of the print version subsidise the cost of producing the book. There is some evidence that making electronic editions of books open access can increase sales of the print edition.

== History ==
While open access to journal articles has become very common, with 50% of articles published in 2011 available as open access, open access to books has not yet seen as much uptake at this time. However, some dedicated open-access book publishers, such as Open Book Publishers, Punctum Books, and others who publish both books and journals like Open Humanities Press, have been launched.

Gradually, academic publishers and university presses have also adopted an open-access monograph approach, offering this publishing option alongside journal articles. Major publishers of open-access books include, for example, Taylor & Francis, MDPI, and MIT Press. The Open Access Publishing in European Networks (OAPEN) online library and publication platform provides access to thousands of peer-reviewed academic books, mainly in the humanities and social sciences. The OAPEN Foundation also provides a directory of open access works via its Directory of Open Access Books (DOAB).

A report released in 2015 by the UK's main funding body for research, the Higher Education Funding Council for England, states the importance of open access monographs: "Monographs are a vitally important and distinctive vehicle for research communication, and must be sustained in any moves to open access." A 2019 survey has shown that a majority of authors agree that all future scholarly books should be made available via open access. A 2023 study found that, out of 396,995 open access books analyzed, only 19% were archived, raising concerns about the longevity and accessibility of many OA books distributed online.

== See also ==
- Directory of Open Access Journals
- Open content
- Openness
- Open Educational Resources
- Open Library of Humanities
- COPIM
