= Knowledge Unlatched =

Library crowdfunding platform

- Website: https://knowledgeunlatched.org/

Knowledge Unlatched (KU) is an Open Access service provider. It offers a crowdfunding model to support a variety of Open Access book and journal content packages as well as the financial funding of partnerships.

KU was originally established in 2012 by Frances Pinter as a British not-for-profit Community Interest Company (CIC). In 2016, under Sven Fund, Knowledge Unlatched GmbH was registered as a for-profit in Berlin, Germany. In 2021, Knowledge Unlatched was acquired by Wiley. In 2025, the journal publisher Annual Reviews signed an agreement with Wiley to acquire Knowledge Unlatched (KU), returning it to nonprofit management.

== History ==
Knowledge Unlatched was established in September 2012 by publisher and social entrepreneur Frances Pinter. It formalized a ‘Global Library Consortium’ model for supporting Open Access books. Pinter developed the idea as a response to a protracted crisis in monograph publishing and the opportunities presented by digital technology and Open Access models.

Pinter first aired her vision for a Global Library Consortium approach to supporting Open Access monograph publishing at events such as the Charleston Conference in 2010. In September 2011, she embarked on a speaking tour of Australia. Her tour included a keynote presentation on academic publishing and the future of the monograph at Queensland University of Technology (QUT). Through the tour, Pinter was able to secure support from QUT, the University of Melbourne, and the University of Western Australia. This included research support for Lucy Montgomery, who worked on the KU pilot and later became become deputy director of Knowledge Unlatched.

Between January 2012 and September 2014, Knowledge Unlatched carried out a proof-of-concept Pilot involving libraries, publishers, authors, readers and funders to test a global library consortium business model for Open Access books. It involved 297 libraries from 24 countries, and opened 28 newly published research titles from 13 scholarly publishers.

As of July 18, 2012, Knowledge Unlatched (KU) registered in Britain as a not-for-profit Community Interest Company (CIC). This registration was dissolved as of December 17, 2024.

In 2016, the legal structure of Knowledge Unlatched (KU) was changed from a British Community Interest Company (CIC) to a German GmbH (limited liability company). In that year, Sven Fund acquired part of KU CIC's assets, transferring them into a for-profit company, Knowledge Unlatched GmbH, which was 100% owned by the consultancy fullstopp GmbH. Sven Fund was managing director of both companies. Pinter, the founder of KU, became director of the then legally independent research unit, KU Research (KUR), the current trading name of Knowledge Unlatched CIC, the founding organisation's name. She was succeeded at KU Research in 2019 by Lucy Montgomery.

In 2019, under Sven Fund, Knowledge Unlatched formed the Open Research Library as a platform to bring together all open access book content through a central repository.

As of December 2021, Knowledge Unlatched was acquired by multinational commercial publishing company Wiley. In 2025, the journal publisher Annual Reviews signed an agreement with Wiley, enabling Annual Reviews to acquire Knowledge Unlatched (KU) and bring it back under nonprofit management.

== Business model ==
Knowledge Unlatched piloted a collective approach to library acquisitions and procurement of Open Access books in its first two collections (the Pilot and Round 2). The model proposed by Pinter in 2011 depends on many libraries from around the world sharing the cost of a single title fee that is paid to a publisher. In return a book is made available via a Creative Commons license through an Open Access repository service, such as "Open Access Publishing in European Networks" (OAPEN), the Open Research Library, and JSTOR.

According to multiple sources, Knowledge Unlatched is cited among other innovative publishing-market initiatives focused on the Open Access sector that have been successful in pooling the funding from participating libraries for covering the costs of transitioning monographs or journals into Diamond Open Access, which removes access barriers to readers and researchers around the world. Annual Reviews' CEO Richard B. Gallagher credits Knowledge Unlatched as one of the examples that inspired development of Annual Reviews' Subscribe to Open publishing model.

=== KU Open Funding ===
KU Open Funding is a database for financing Open Access books. It enables scientists and libraries to compare offerings from different publishers. Suitable offers can be found on the basis of more than 20 criteria, such as the subject area, the services of publishers, forms of licensing and publication costs. If the latter accepts the manuscript for publication after quality control, KU organises the approval and handling of payment with the library. More than twenty publishers such as Berghahn Books, Duke University Press, Intellect, University of Michigan Press, Taylor & Francis, Transcript Verlag and Ubiquity Press participated with their Open Access offerings during the launch in November 2018.

=== KU Partners ===
Knowledge Unlatched partners with a wide range of scholarly publishers to support Open Access books, journals, and other forms of scholarly content across both the Humanities and Social Sciences (HSS) and STEM disciplines. Publishing partners include Routledge, Berghahn Books, EDP Sciences, IWA Publishing, Luminos (University of California Press), Language Science Press, wbv Media, and Stanford University Press. As of 2024, these collaborations have made approximately 5,000 titles openly accessible and sustained the OA publication of 60 scholarly journals.

== Awards ==
Knowledge Unlatched was shortlisted for the ALPSP Awards for Innovation in Publishing 2016.

In September 2015, Knowledge Unlatched won a Curtin University Award in the category of Best Innovation in Education. The competition attracted a record 46 applications from across Curtin University with 12 applicants shortlisted to present to a panel of judges looking at novelty, level of development, market potential and competitive advantage.

In June 2014, Knowledge Unlatched was selected as the 2014 winner of the IFLA/Brill Open Access Award. The jury for the prize awarded by the International Federation of Library Associations and Institutions (IFLA) and Brill Publishers voted unanimously for Knowledge Unlatched.

In February 2015, Knowledge Unlatched was named by Outsell, Inc., as one of their 10 to companies to watch.

== See also ==
- Open access in Germany
