= Jelliffe =

Jelliffe is a surname. Notable people with the surname include:

- Derrick and Patrice Jelliffe (1921–1992 and 1920–2007), authors and researchers of pediatric issues, notably infant formula
- Rick Jelliffe (born 1960), Australian computer programmer and promoter of the Microsoft Office Open XML document format
- Smith Ely Jelliffe (1866–1945), American neurologist and psychiatrist
