= UCLA Fielding School of Public Health =

Public health school at the University of California, Los Angeles

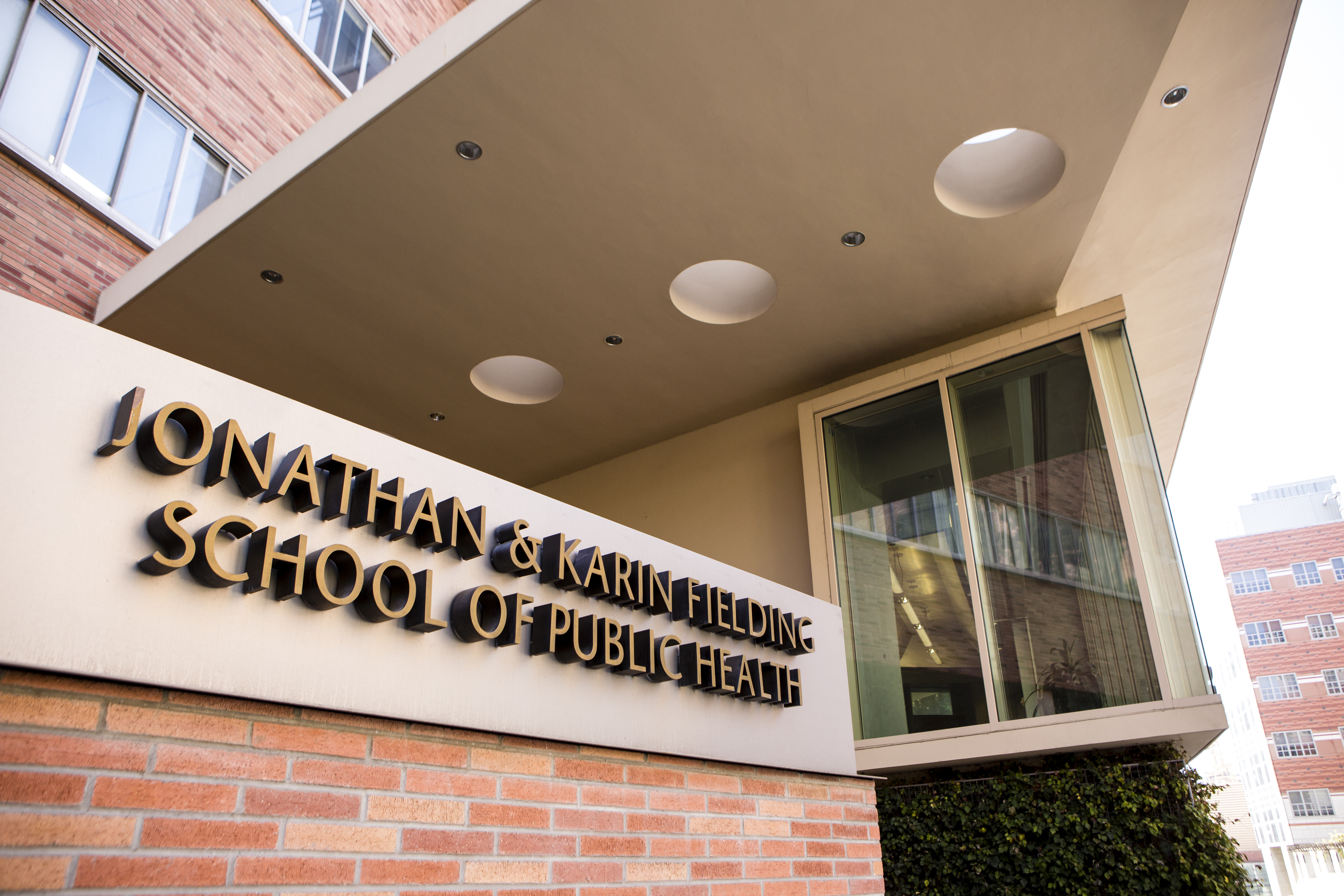
- UCLA Fielding School of Public Health building main entrance
- Type: Public
- Established: 1961
- Parent institution: University of California, Los Angeles
- Dean: Dr. Kari Nadeau
- Faculty: 247, 70 full-time
- Students: nearly 1,000 from 25 countries
- Postgraduates: 480
- Doctoral students: 210
- Location: Los Angeles, California, US; 34.066750°N 118.448280°W
- Website: ph.ucla.edu
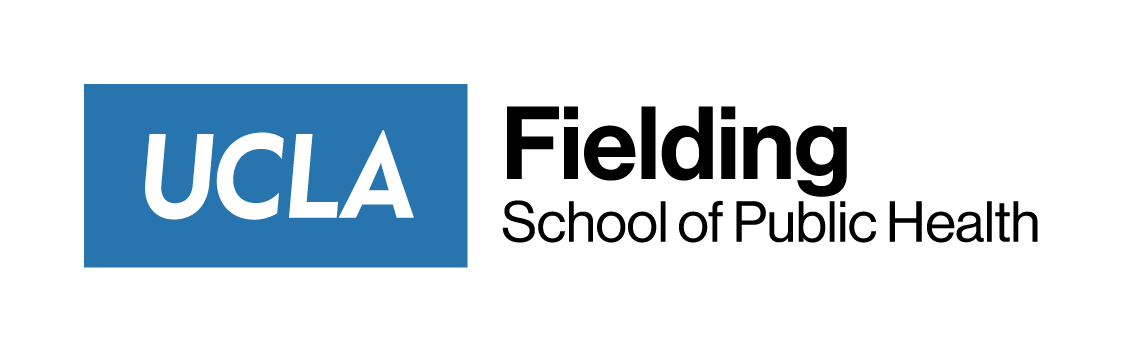

The UCLA Jonathan and Karin Fielding School of Public Health is the graduate school of public health at UCLA, and is located within the Center for Health Sciences building on UCLA's campus in the Westwood neighborhood of Los Angeles, California. The UCLA Fielding School of Public Health has nearly 1,000 students representing 25 countries, more than 12,000 alumni and 247 faculty, 70 of whom are full-time. The school was founded in 1961. UCLA Fielding School of Public Health was ranked number 6 (tied) in the country by U.S. News & World Report in their 2026 list of all accredited schools and programs of public health.

== History ==
UCLA began offering undergraduate instruction in public health in 1946. For the next fifteen years, public health instruction at UCLA was within a system-wide University of California public health school. In 1957, UCLA started a program that led to an advanced degree in public health. The UCLA School of Public Health was created on March 17, 1961, and Lenor S. (Steve) Goerke was named the first dean. In June 1993, UCLA announced that it was planning to merge the School of Public Health into the School of Public Policy. UCLA rescinded the plan in March 1994.

In 2003, the School of Public Health began awarding an undergraduate minor in public health.

On February 16, 2012, the school received a gift valued at $50 million from the Fielding family, the largest single donation the school has received since its creation in 1962. On March 22, 2012 the school was officially named the UCLA Jonathan and Karin Fielding School of Public Health and the new sign on the building was unveiled.

== Students and Faculty ==
=== Students ===
The UCLA Fielding School of Public Health has nearly 1,000 students from 25 countries. The school has five academic departments — Biostatistics, Community Health Sciences, Environmental Health Sciences, Epidemiology, and Health Policy and Management — and offers seven degree types: BS, BA, MPH, MS, MHA, MDSH, and PhD. Additionally, concurrent and articulated degrees and certificates enable students to gain specialized knowledge in areas such as global health, population and reproductive health, environmental health, and health care management and leadership.

=== Faculty ===
The school also has 19 Memoranda of Understanding with institutions in countries that include Cambodia, China, Democratic Republic of the Congo, Germany, Mexico and the Philippines. The schools of medicine, law, nursing, business, dentistry, engineering and more are all located on the Westwood campus of UCLA, named the No. 1 public university in the United States in 2018. Additionally, UCLA ranked ninth in the world in research and teaching according to the 2018 Times Higher Education World (University) Reputation Rankings.

== Departments and degrees ==
The UCLA Fielding School of Public Health offers degrees in the following departments:

- Biostatistics — MPH, MS, PhD, DrPH
- Community Health Sciences — MPH, MS, PhD, DrPH
- Environmental Health Sciences — MPH, MS, PhD, DrPH
- Epidemiology — MPH, MS, PhD, DrPH
- Health Policy and Management — MPH, MS, PhD, DrPH

The Fielding School of Public Health offers two executive-style MPH degrees:

- Community Health Sciences – MPH for Health Professionals (MPH-HP)
- Health Policy and Management – Executive MPH (EMPH)

UCLA also offers an interdepartmental degrees:

- Molecular Toxicology — PhD

The Fielding School of Public Health offers the following joint degrees with other UCLA graduate schools:

- Fielding School of Public Health/African Studies Program (MPH / MA)
- Fielding School of Public Health/Asian American Studies Program (MPH / MA)
- Fielding School of Public Health/Latin American Studies Program (MPH / MA)
- Fielding School of Public Health/School of Law (MPH / JD)
- Fielding School of Public Health/School of Management (MPH / MBA)
- Fielding School of Public Health/School of Medicine (MPH / MD)
- Fielding School of Public Health/Department of Social Welfare (MPH / MSW)
- Fielding School of Public Health/Department of Urban and Regional Planning (MPH / MURP)
- Fielding School of Public Health/Department of Public Policy (MPH / MPP)

== Research centers ==
UCLA Fielding School of Public Health faculty and students are involved in projects that span bench science, applied research, policy analysis, and community-based local and international projects. Examples of research areas include: access to healthcare, environmental quality, reproductive health, cancer, health disparities, children's health, as well as newer areas of strength in genomics, global health and emerging infectious diseases. Research throughout the school is supported by generous federal, state and private funding, a testament to the merit of the school's faculty and the quality of their research.

The UCLA Fielding School of Public Health research centers include:

- Biobehavioral Assessment Research Center (BARC)
- Bixby Center on Population and Reproductive Health
- Center for Cancer Prevention and Control Research
- Center for Environmental Genomics
- Center for Global and Immigrant Health
- Center for Healthcare Management
- Center for Healthier Children, Families, and Communities
- Center for Occupational and Environmental Health
- Center for Public Health and Disasters
- Center for the Study of Racism, Social Justice & Health
- Southern California NIOSH Education and Research Center
- UCLA Center for Health Advancement
- UCLA Center for Health Policy Research
- UCLA Center for Healthy Climate Solutions
- UCLA Center for LGBTQ Advocacy, Research & Health
- UCLA Center for Prevention Research
- UCLA Kaiser Permanente Center for Health Equity (formerly the Center to Eliminate Health Disparities)
- UCLA Labor Occupational Safety and Health Program (LOSH)
- WORLD Policy Analysis Center

== Notable people ==
=== Alumni ===
- Amy Kelley, geriatrician and palliative care specialist, deputy director of the National Institute on Aging

=== Faculty ===
- Abdelmonem A. Afifi — Dean of UCLA School of Public Health (1985–2000)
- Roslyn Alfin-Slater — Demonstrated that cholesterol in normal diets does not raise serum cholesterol
- Lester Breslow — Dean of UCLA School of Public Health (1972–1980); Former president of the American Public Health Association
- Ron Brookmeyer — Seventh dean of the UCLA Fielding School of Public Health (2020-2026); Interim dean of the school (2018–2020) Currently a distinguished professor of biostatistics at the school.
- E. Richard Brown — Former president of the American Public Health Association
- Roger Detels — Dean of UCLA School of Public Health (1980–1985); Demonstrated how HIV-related immune deficiency is transmitted among homosexual men
- Gladys Emerson — Conducted research leading to the isolation and discovery of the nutritional value of vitamin E
- Jonathan Fielding — Former Director of Los Angeles County Department of Public Health; namesake of Fielding School of Public Health; awarded the UCLA Medal on April 16, 2009 for his work as an innovator, leader and public health visionary
- John Froines — Professor in environmental health sciences, former Director of Toxic Substances for Occupational Safety and Health Administration, and member of the Chicago Seven
- Jody Heymann — Dean Emeritus of the UCLA Fielding School of Public Health (2012-2018)
- Derrick and Patrice Jelliffe — Led efforts to promote the benefits of breastfeeding on a global scale
- Lenor Stephen (Steve) Goerke — Dean of UCLA School of Public Health — (1961–1972)
- Sander Greenland — Professor of epidemiology and statistics, co-author of "Modern Epidemiology", one of the most widely used textbooks of advanced epidemiology (now in 3rd edition)
- Michael Goldstein — Author of international bestseller "Alternative Health Care: Medicine, Miracle, or Mirage?"
- Frank J. Massey — first Associate Dean of the School of Public Health and first Chair of the Department of Biostatistics
- Matthew J. Mimiaga — Professor of Epidemiology and Psychiatry & Biobehavioral Sciences, and inaugural director of the UCLA Center for LGBTQ+ Advocacy, Research & Health
- Kari Nadeau — Eighth dean of the UCLA Fielding School of Public Health (2026 - present).
- Richard Jackson - Professor of Public Health and Environmental Health Sciences, and elected member of the Institute of Medicine, creator of Designing Healthy Communities by PBS and author of (with Stacy Sinclair)Designing Healthy Communities, Jossey-Bass, San Francisco, 2012
- Jack Needleman - Professor of Health Policy and Management, and elected member of the Institute of Medicine
- Milton Roemer — Internationally known health systems researcher. "Roemer's law" refers to the observation that in a fully insured population, any hospital bed that is built will be filled Ruth Roemer — Former president of the American Public Health Association
- Linda Rosenstock — Dean Emeritus of UCLA School of Public Health (2000–2012)
- Paul R. Torrens — Author of widely used health policy textbook
- Eleven current faculty are elected members of the prestigious National Academy of Science's Institute of Medicine
- Ninez A. Ponce — Director of the UCLA Center for Health Policy Research, Principal Investigator of the California Health Interview Survey, and Chair and Professor of the Department of Health Policy and Management Professor at UCLA Fielding School of Public Health
