= Gil Omenn =

American doctor (born 1941)

Gilbert S. Omenn
- Born: August 30, 1941 (age 84)
- Education: Princeton University, Harvard Medical School, University of Washington
- Scientific career
- Fields: Genetics, Public Health
- Workplaces: University of Michigan.

External videos
- "Distinguished University Professorship Lecture - Gilbert Omenn", University of Michigan, March 28, 2017.

Gilbert S. Omenn (born August 30, 1941) is an American medical doctor and researcher. He currently is the Harold T. Shapiro Distinguished University Professor at the University of Michigan; Professor of Computational medicine & bioinformatics, Molecular medicine & genetics, Human genetics, and Public health; and the Director of the UM Center for Computational Medicine & Bioinformatics. He is the discoverer of Omenn syndrome, a genetic disorder that is fatal in infancy unless treated. Omenn has served as editor of the Annual Review of Public Health from 1990–1996. and as president of the American Association for the Advancement of Science (AAAS). He has published more than 600 peer-reviewed papers and reviews and is the author or editor of 18 books.

== Education ==
Omenn received a B.A. from Princeton University (class of 1961) and an M.D. from Harvard Medical School (1965). He interned and did his residency at Massachusetts General Hospital.

Omenn worked with Christian B. Anfinsen at the National Institutes of Health from 1967-1969, doing research as part of military service. In 1969, he joined the University of Washington (UW) in Seattle, Washington as a fellow, working with Arno G. Motulsky in medical genetics. He went on to earn a Ph.D. in genetics from the University of Washington, which he received in 1972.

== Career ==
As a fourth-year student, Omenn studied prenatal diagnosis of inherited conditions. He discovered what is now known as Omenn syndrome, a genetic disorder characterized by the loss of T-cell function. It is generally fatal in infancy, but some cases have responded to treatment.

In 1971 Omenn joined the faculty of medical genetics at the University of Washington. Omenn was appointed as a White House Fellow in 1973-1974, under Presidents Richard Nixon and Gerald Ford. He was one of two staff on Nixon's Project Independence, looking for ways to lessen America's dependence on imported oil. He was also part of a diplomatic mission to convince France not to share nuclear information with Pakistan. Omenn worked with the Atomic Energy Commission on international nuclear policy.

As of 1974 Omenn was first appointed to the National Cancer Advisory Board, as an alternate for Frank Press, Director of the Office of Science and Technology Policy. Omenn's title was Assistant Director of Human Resources, Office of Science and Technology Policy. During 1977-1981, Omenn worked with the Carter administration, first as an assistant to Frank Press, the President's advisor on Science and Technology Policy, and then as Associate Director in the Office of Management and Budget.

Omenn founded the Robert Wood Johnson Clinical Scholars Program at the University of Washington in 1975. He was a Howard Hughes Medical Institute investigator for 1976-1977. He was promoted to a full professorship in medicine in 1979. While at UW, Omenn began working with the Fred Hutchinson Cancer Research Center in Seattle, to conduct clinical trials in cancer prevention. He served as principal investigator of the beta-Carotene and Retinol Efficacy Trial (CARET) seeking preventive agents against lung cancer and heart disease.

In 1981, he was a visiting professor at the Woodrow Wilson School of Princeton University and the Brookings Institution's first Science, Technology, and Policy Fellow.

In 1982, Omenn became Chair of the Department of Environmental & Occupational Health Sciences (DEOHS) and then Dean of the School of Public Health at the University of Washington, serving from 1982-1997. He continues to be an affiliate professor of the university.

In 1982, Omenn and Elaine Faustman at UW introduced a multi-disciplinary course on Risk Assessment and Risk Management. Omenn's work on risk emphasizes science-based risk analysis and the importance of assessing health and ecological risks, communicating information, and reducing risks to health and the environment. From 1982-1988, Omen chaired the National Research Council's Committee on Science, Engineering and Public Policy. From 1990 to 1992, he served on the National Commission on the Environment, resulting in publication of "Choosing a Sustainable Future: The Report of the National Commission on the Environment" (1993). From 1994-1997, Omenn chaired the Presidential/Congressional Commission on Risk Assessment and Risk Management ("Omenn Commission"). The commission was mandated by the Clean Air Act Amendments of 1990, and disbanded as of August 31, 1997.

We are stretching beyond the limits of science to discuss risk. So it is not surprising that scientists disagree on risk estimates or on what should be done, if anything, to reduce those risks. Nevertheless, the public finds such disagreement disconcerting, and the cartoonists mock us!... We need to explain better what is known and what is speculated.– Gilbert Omenn, 1996

In 1997 Omenn moved to the University of Michigan. From 1997 to 2002 he served as Executive Vice President for Medical Affairs and as Chief Executive Officer of the University of Michigan Health System. In 2015 he was named the Harold T. Shapiro Distinguished University Professor of Medicine.

Omenn was a founder of the international Human Proteome Organization (HUPO) in 2001, a member of the Council of HUPO's pilot Plasma Proteome Project from 2002 through 2010, and chair of the Human Proteome Project from 2010 through 2018.

Omenn is Past President (2005-2006) and Past Chairman of the Board (2006-2007) of the American Association for the Advancement of Science. He is a longtime director of Amgen Inc. and of Rohm & Haas Company. Omenn served as editor of the Annual Review of Public Health from 1990–1996. As of 2020, he joined the Board of Directors of the Foundation for the National Institutes of Health (FNIH).

In 2012, the National Academy of Medicine (NAM) Fellowship program created the Gilbert S. Omenn Fellowship, to be awarded in his name. The inaugural Omenn Fellow was Deidra C. Crews.

== Awards ==
- 1978, Elected Fellow, American College of Physicians
- 1978, Elected member, Institute of Medicine of the National Academy of Sciences
- 1999, Elected member, Association of American Physicians
- 2001, Elected member, American Academy of Arts and Sciences
- 2004, John W. Gardner Legacy of Leadership Award, White House Fellows Association
- 2008, Walsh McDermott Medal, Institute of Medicine, for long-term contributions to the IOM and the National Academy of Sciences.
- 2013, David E. Rogers Award, Association of American Medical Colleges
- 2026, Philip Hauge Abelson Prize, American Association for the Advancement of Science (AAAS)

== Archives ==
- Gilbert S. Omenn papers, 1960-1985, University of Washington Libraries, Special Collections
