= Jonathan Fielding =

American physician

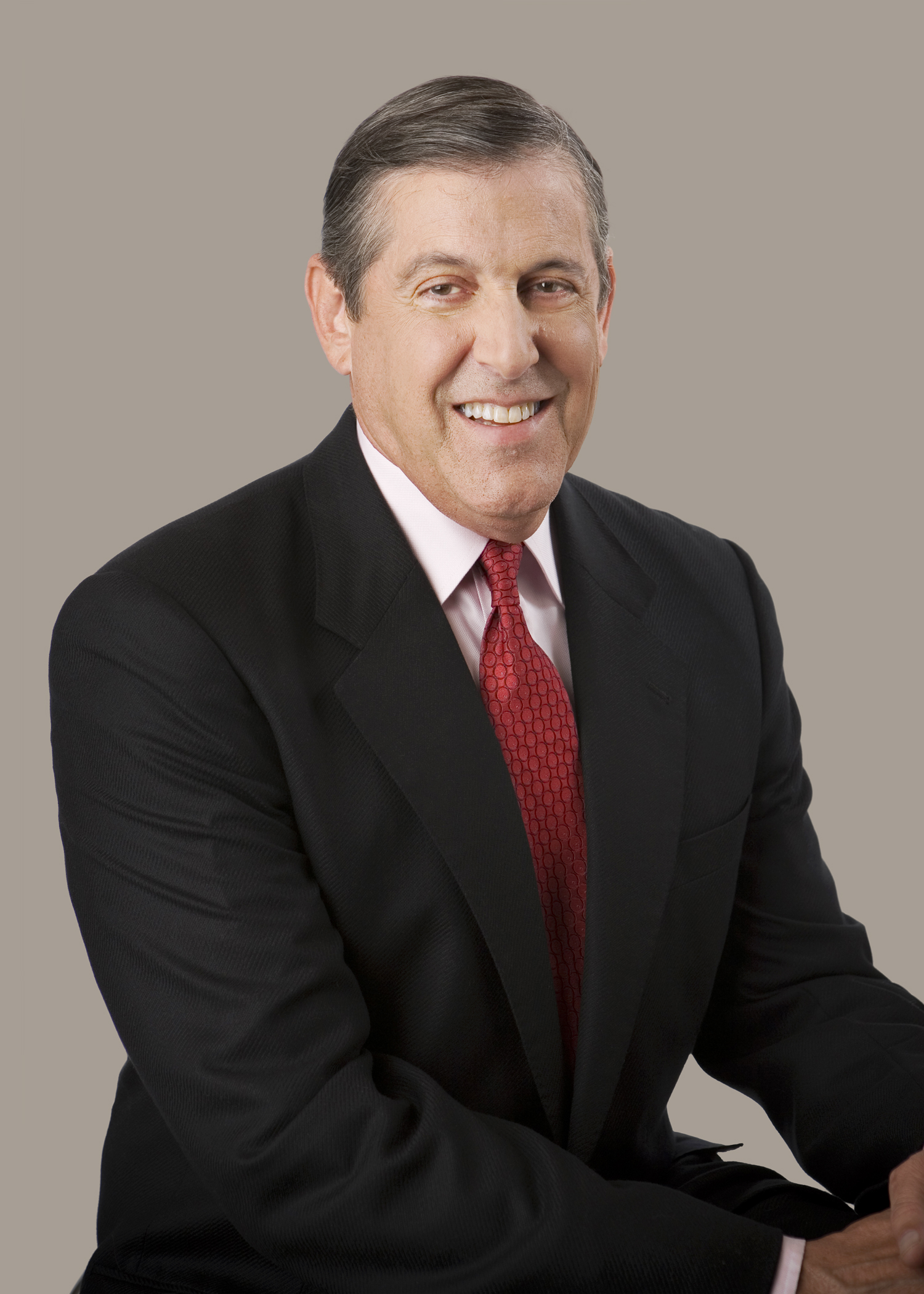
- Fielding in 2006

Director of the Los Angeles County Department of Public Health
- In office 4 April 2008 – 2014
- Succeeded by: Barbara Ferrer

Health Officer for Los Angeles County
- Succeeded by: Jeffrey Gunzenhauser

Personal details
- Born: 1942 (age 83–84)
- Spouse: Karin Fielding
- Education: Williams College; Harvard Graduate School of Arts and Sciences; Harvard Medical School; Harvard School of Public Health; Wharton School of Business
- Occupation: Physician, professor, and philanthropist

Jonathan Evan Fielding (born 1942) is a board-certified physician in both Pediatrics and Preventive Medicine, and the former director and health officer of the Los Angeles County Department of Public Health. At UCLA, he is a Distinguished Professor in the Fielding School of Public Health and a Professor in the David Geffen School of Medicine. He is the founder and co-director of the UCLA Center for Health Advancement in the UCLA Fielding School of Public Health.

Fielding was elected as a member of the Institute of Medicine (now the National Academy of Medicine) in 1995. He has served as President (1997-1999) of the American College of Preventive Medicine and as editor of the Annual Review of Public Health.

== Early life and education ==
In 1964, Fielding received a B.A. in French from Williams College. He attended Harvard University, Graduate School of Arts and Sciences and Harvard University, School of Medicine in 1969 and two years later graduated from Harvard School of Public Health. While attending medical school, he conducted residencies in pediatrics at the Boston Children's Hospital and Georgetown University Medical Center. In 1977, he received an MBA from Wharton School of Business.

== Career ==
External audio
- "Cities Get Ready", Interview about avian influenza with Dr. Fielding, October 14, 2005, Living on Earth, NPR.

Fielding was the Principal Medical Services National Officer for Job Corps in the United States Department of Labor from 1971-1973 and a Special Assistant to the Director in the Department of Health, Education, and Welfare. Fielding served as Director of the Health Services Administration within the Department of Health, Education, and Welfare from 1974 to 1975. Fielding served as Commissioner of Public Health in the Commonwealth of Massachusetts from 1975-1979.

In 1979, Fielding became Professor of Public Health and Medicine at the University of California, Los Angeles (UCLA) where he founded the Center for Health Enhancement Education and Research. From 1995-2008 Fielding also co-directed the Center for Healthier Children, Families, and Communities. Dr. Fielding became a Distinguished Professor of Public Health and Medicine at UCLA in 2011.

In 1983, Dr. Fielding founded US Corporate Health Management Incorporated, providing consulting to corporations on health care policy. In 1986 Johnson & Johnson took over the company. It became Johnson & Johnson Health Management, with Fielding as Senior Vice President. Fielding left Johnson & Johnson in 1993.

In 1996, Dr. Fielding became the Acting Health Officer and Senior Policy Advisor to the Director of the Los Angeles County Department of Health Services. In 1998, Fielding became Director and Health Officer of the Department of Health Services. On May 30, 2006, the Los Angeles County Board of Supervisors approved the establishment of a separate Los Angeles County Department of Public Health. It was formally established on July 7, 2006, with Fielding appointed as its Director in August 23, 2006. He served for over 16 years as Director and County Health Officer, dealing with the health and safety of over 10 million people in Los Angeles, California.

Fielding oversaw public health activities, including those for environmental health, disease control, health education, health assessment, and chronic diseases. During his tenure, Fielding led efforts to develop plans to deal with emergencies related to natural disasters, bioterrorism, pandemic flu, and other emerging threats to health and safety. He also called attention to the underlying determinants of health, including wide disparities in the physical and social environments in which people live.

Fielding was responsible for implementing the Los Angeles County "A B C" restaurant letter-grading system which has been widely emulated throughout the U.S.A. Under the system, businesses undergo mandatory inspections, and the results are posted so that consumers have information they can use to inform their decisions about where to eat. The program is reported to have decreased restaurant food-related illness by as much as 20 percent. Other programs discourage tobacco use and encourage healthy nutrition, physical activity, and serving of appropriately-sized portions by restaurants.

Fielding was a witness for the 2002 Little Hoover Commission Public Hearing, appearing on June 27, 2002. Also in 2002, Fielding and Tom Frieden of New York City helped to form the Big Cities Health Coalition (BCHC) which addresses concerns of particular interest to cities with large populations, high population density, and a somewhat dysfunctional "urban core". Fielding has also served as commissioner and vice-chair of the First 5 Los Angeles Commission, whose mission is to improve health and development of children 5 years of age and under, granting over $100 million annually.

On March 27, 2014, Fielding announced that he would retire from the department and go back to UCLA "to help train future health leaders and do research on how we can be even more effective."

"We still have such an enormous, preventable burden of disease and injury that it's important always to look at what more needs to be done, rather than focusing on our accomplishments." Jonathan Fielding, 2014.

As of 2021 Fielding is the Distinguished Professor-in-Residence of Health Policy and Management in the Schools of Public Health and Medicine at the University of California, Los Angeles.

He has authored over 300 peer-reviewed articles, chapters and editorials, publishing on a wide range of public health and preventive medicine issues. He has served as associate editor and then editor of the Annual Review of Public Health over a 35-year period. In 2016, Fielding started writing a monthly column for U.S. News & World Report on current topics in public health. He also writes opinion pieces for The Hill.

Fielding has been a member of a number of national-level task forces that assess best evidence and make recommendations to improve the health of the public. He was a founding member of the U.S. Clinical Preventive Services Task Force. Fielding also served on the Community Preventive Services Task Force from 1996-2019, chairing it from 2001-2019.

Fielding is a former board member and former chair of the national Truth Initiative (formerly the American Legacy Foundation), which oversees $1 billion from the (year) tobacco settlement to end youth use of combustible cigarettes and other nicotine delivery devices. He has also chaired the Partnership for Prevention, no whose behalf he testified in hearings before the Subcommittee on Health of the United States House Committee on Ways and Means in the first session of the 103rd United States Congress.

Fielding is a founding member of Shatterproof, a national organization working to end addiction, and an advisor to UCLA's Sound Body Sound Mind, improving youth fitness through enhanced school programs. He was a founding board member and chairman of the California Wellness Foundation.

In 2008, Fielding was appointed by the Secretary of Health and Human Services Micha el Leavitt to chair the Secretary's Advisory Committee on the 2020 Health Objectives for the Nation, and in 2016 appointed a Co-Chair emeritus for the Advisory Committee for the 2030 national Health Objectives. In January 2011 he was appointed by President Barack Obama to the Advisory Group on Prevention, Health Promotion, and Integrative and Public Health, becoming one of the 13 founding members of the group.

== Philanthropy ==
On February 15, 2012, the School of Public Health at UCLA received a $50 million gift from the Fieldings, the largest single donation the school received since its creation in 1962. It was proposed that the school be renamed the UCLA Jonathan and Karin Fielding School of Public Health. It is now the UCLA Fielding School of Public Health.

The Fieldings also provided a lead gift to support the construction of the Fielding Wing of American Folk Art at the Huntington Library, Botanical Gardens and Art Collection in San Marino, California, donating a substantial portion of their American folk art collection to that institution. As of 2016, the first 250 items from their collection were installed at the Huntingdon. They included portraits, landscape, furniture, textiles, pottery, ironwork, and other items, generally made in New England between 1680 and 1870.

As of 2021, the Fieldings established the Jonathan and Karin Fielding Presidential Chair in Health Equity at the UCLA Fielding School of Public Health, naming Lara Cushing to the position. Cushing has done research into harmful environmental exposures and their disproportionate impacts on communities that are home to low-income people and people of color.

In 2024 he and his wife funded an endowed chair in climate change at the Fielding School of Public Health. The inaugural holder of the Jonathan Fielding Chair in Climate Change and Public Health is UCLA FSPH Professor Michael Jerrett.

== Awards and honors ==
- 1994, Porter Prize, Graduate School of Public Health, University of Pittsburgh for National Impact on Improving the Health of Americans
- 1995, Elected Member, Institute of Medicine, National Academy of Sciences (now the National Academy of Medicine)
- 2000, Distinguished Service Award for Outstanding Service, American College of Preventive Medicine
- 2003, Milton and Ruth Roemer Prize, for Creative Local Public Health Work, American Public Health Association (APHA)
- 2006, Outstanding Alumnus Award, Harvard School of Public Health
- 2006, Sedgwick Memorial Medal, American Public Health Association (APHA)
- 2007, Beverlee A. Myers Award for Excellence in Public Health, California Department of Public Health
- 2009, To LA County Environmental Health Services, the Winston Crouch Award for Innovation in Government, American Society for Public Administration
- 2009, UCLA Medal and Lester Breslow Distinguished Lectureship, University of California Los Angeles, for his work as an innovator, leader and public health visionary. The UCLA Medal is the university's highest honor.
- 2012, Honorary Fellow Award, Society for Public Health Education (SOPHE) for his visionary leadership and lifetime of contributions to public health.
- 2012, Fries Prize for Improving Health, The James F. and Sarah T. Fries Foundation, for pioneering work in identifying and applying effective worksite and public prevention programs and policies that have improved health for million of Americans.
- 2012, coauthor, Paper of the Year, American Journal of Public Health for "Health Disparities and Health Equity: The Issues Is Justice".
- 2014, Visionary Award, Venice Family Clinic Silver Circle Gala
- 2014. Earl Warren Outstanding Public Service Award, American Society of Public Administration (ASPA)
- 2014, Kellogg Award, Williams College
- 2015, Bicentennial Medal, Williams College

== Selected publications ==
- Adler, Nancy E.; Cutler, David M.; Fielding, Jonathan E.; Galea, Sandro; Glymour, M. Maria; Koh, Howard K.; Satcher, and David (September 19, 2016). "Addressing Social Determinants of Health and Health Disparities: A Vital Direction for Health and Health Care". NAM Perspectives. 6 (9). doi:10.31478/201609t. ISSN 2578-6865.
- Cole, B.L., Shimkhada, R., Morgenstern, H., Kominski, G., Fielding, J.E., Wu, S., "Projected Health Impact of the Los Angeles City Living Wage Ordinance" JECH, 59:645-650. (2005).
- Anderson, L.M., Brownson, R.C., Fullilove, M.T., Teutsch, St.M., Novick, L.F., Fielding, J.E., Land, G.H. "Evidence-Based Public Health Policy and Practice: Promise and Limits" Am Journal of Prev Med, 28 (5S) (2005).
- Georgenson, M., Thorpe, L.E., Merlino, M., Frieden, T.R., Fielding, J.E., The Big Cities Health Coalition, "Shortchanged? An Assessment of Chronic Disease Programming in Major US City Health Departments" J Urban Health. June;82 (2):233-4 (2005).
- Simon, P.A., Leslie, P., Run G. Jion, G.Z., Rporter, R. Aguirre, A., Fielding, J.E., "Impact of Restaurant Hygiene Grade Cards on Foodborne-Disease Hospitalizations in Los Angeles County" JEnviron Health, Mar;67 (7):32-6, 56; quiz 59060, (2005).
- Cole, B.L., Shimkhada, R., Fielding, J.E., Kominski, G., Morgenstern, H., "Methodologies for Realizing the Potential of Health Impact Assessment" Am J of Prev Med, May;28 (4):382-9, (2005).
- Cole, B.L., Shimkhada, R., Morgenstern, H., Kominski, G., Fielding, J.E., Wu, S., "Projected Health Impact of the Los Angeles City Living Wage Ordinance" JEpidemiol Community Health, 59:645-650 (2005).
- Eisenman, D.P., Wold, C., Fielding, J.E., Long, A., Setodji, C., Hickey, S., Gelberg, L., "Differences in Individual-Level Terrorism Preparedness in Los Angeles County" Am J Prev Med, (2005).
- Dannenberg, A.L., Bhatia, R., Cole, B.L., Dora, C., Fielding, J.E., Kraft, K., McClymonth-Peace, D., Mindell, J., Onyekere, C., Roberts, J.A., Ross, C.L., Rutt, C.D., Scott-Samuel, A., Tilson. H.H., "Growing the Field of Health Impact Assessment in the United States: An Agenda for Research and Practice" AM J. PH, Vol. 96, No. 2 (2006).
- Simon, P.A., Fielding, J.E., "Public Health and Business: A Partnership That Makes Cents" Health Affairs 25, no.4, 1029-1039 (2006).
- Fielding, J.E., Briss, Peter A., "Promoting Evidence-Based Public Health Policy: Can We Have Better Evidence And More Action?" Health Affairs 25, No.4, 969-978 (2006).
- Cole, B.L., Shimkhada, R., Fielding, J.E., Kominski, G., Morgenstern, H., "Health Impact Assessment: Current Practice and Future Potential to Increase Awareness of Population Health Impacts of Policy Decisions" (accepted – AM J of Prev Med).
- Cole, B.L., Shimkhada, R., Morgegenstern, H., Kominski, G., Fielding, J.E., Wu, S., "An Examination of the Potential Health Consequences of Expanded Funding for After-School Programs – The Role of Research Versus Rhetoric" (in Review – J of Policy analysis and Management).
- Yancey, A., Lewis, L., Sloane, D., Diamant, A., McCarthy, W., Guinyard, J.J., Fielding, J.E., "Walking the Talk: Process Evaluation of a Local Health Department-Community Collaboration Incorporate Physical Activity Into Organizational Practice" (in press – PubMed).
- Ockene, J.K., Edgerton, E.A., Teutsch, S.M., Marion, L.N., Miller, T., Genevro, J.L., Loveland-Cherry, C.J., Fielding, J.E., Briss, P.A., "Integrating Evidence-Based Clinical and Community Strategies to Improve Health" (in press – AJPM).

== Archives ==
- Fielding (Jonathan E.) papers, UCLA: Library Special Collections, Medicine and Science.
