= Phaedon Fessas =

Professor of medicine (b. 1922, d. 2015)

Phaedon Fessas (1922-2015) was a Greek Professor of Medicine at the Medical School of Athens University. He was Director of the 1st Department of Internal Medicine at the Laikon Hospital in Athens (1969-1989), where he established a very strong Hematology Division, his particular subspecialty. Professor Fessas was a clinician, teacher and researcher. His main research interest was thalassemia.

== Education and military service ==
He graduated from the Experimental School of the University of Athens in 1939.

He started his studies at the Medical School of the University of Athens in 1939 and due to the War he graduated in 1947.

In the Greek-Italian War he served as a stretcher bearer ιn the Red Cross, in the blood donation service.

During the Occupation he participated in the National Resistance by contributing in the publication of the "Radio Bulletin" and the newspaper "Eleftheria". He was arrested and imprisoned twice, by the Italians in 1942 and by the Germans in 1944.

== Medical teaching career ==
He began working at the 2nd Internal Medicine Department of the University of Athens in January 1948 as an in-house assistant and immediately afterwards served as an army doctor until 1951.

From 1952 to 1954 he completed his postgraduate studies with a Fulbright Scholarship at the Utah University Medical School, next to Professor M.M. Wintrobe.

Returning to Greece, in 1955 he was named Doctor of Medicine of the Athens Medical School.

From 1955 to 1957 he worked as a Registrar in the Second Medical Department under Professor Arkagathos Guttas. There he began his research on pathological hemoglobins, types of thalassemia and the development of methods for the diagnosis and investigation of hereditary anemias.

In 1957 he took over the direction of the Blood Donation Service of the Alexandra Maternity Hospital and the organization of the Hematology Laboratory of the Department of Therapeutics, under Professor Vasilios Malamos.

In parallel with the clinical and laboratory monitoring of internal patients, the care of patients with thalassemia, the teaching and education of students and specialists, he began his research work that made him internationally known.

His special interest were the hemoglobinopathies, with a major focus on thalassemia. He studied and described the pathological physiology of these disease syndromes and he was the first to describe inclusions in erythroblasts and red cells in β-thalassemia, which were named Fessas bodies and pointed out the importance of embryonic hemoglobin. He also studied the incidence and distribution of thalassemia in the Greek population, which ultimately led to the design of a very successful diagnosis and prevention program. He has also dealt with the ethical issues that arise from the development of science in these areas.

In 1965 he was elected Lecturer of the University of Athens and the subject of his dissertation was "The derangement of hemoglobin synthesis in thalassemia". Among his numerous contributions to the field of thalassemia, some of whom are cited in Bibliography below, are two seminal papers in the journals Nature and Science and a Book on Radiology of Thalassemia.

In 1969 he was elected Professor of Internal Medicine at the Medical School of the University of Athens and took over the direction of the 1st Department of Internal Medicine at the Laikon Hospital.

During this 20 years as Professor, the 1st Department of Internal Medicine became an example for the training of new doctors in Clinical Medicine and especially in Clinical Hematology. Many generations of Greek Hematologists and Internists have been taught by Professor Fessas and several of his students became themselves Professors of Medicine or Hematology or Directors of big Hematology Departments in Greece and abroad.

In 1987 he was elected president and in 1988 Dean of the School of Health Sciences.

In 1989 he left the university and was named Professor Emeritus.

== Post teaching activities ==
He was among the founding members and one of the early Presidents of the Hellenic Society of Hematology.

With his collaborators he established the Greek Centre for Diagnosis and Prevention of Thalassemia, which had resulted in a very significant reduction of births of infants with thalassemia in Greece.

After his retirement he remained close to the university and the Thalassemia Center offering his services in every way. He managed to realize his dream of organizing and operating the Library of Health Sciences in 1997 and was the President of this Library until 2000.

== Awards and positions ==
He received many awards and honorary titles and served as Dean of the School of Medicine of the Athens University.

The Hellenic Society of Hematology established an annual "Phaedon Fessas" award to be given at the Annual Meeting of the Society to the best scientific presentation.

== Advisory Bodies and Research Institutions ==
National Hellenic Research Foundation - President National Research Advisory Board - Member Thalassaemia International Federation - Scientific member

== Scientific Societies ==
- Founding member of the Hellenic Haematological Society
- Founding member of the Greek Society of Medical Genetics
- Founding member of the Society for Medical Studies
- Member of the Medical Society of Athens
- Member of the Hellenic Biological Society
- Member of the Hellenic Biochemical Society
- Member of the Board of Directors of the Medical School of the University of Athens
- Member of the International Hematology Society / Honorary Vice-president
- Member of the European Society for Human Genetics
- American Society of Hematology / Honorary Member
- Cooley's Anemia, Blood and Research Foundation / Counselor
- Deutsche Gesellschaft für Hamatologie corresponding / member
- Mediterranean Blood Club / member
- Union Medical Balkanique Member Holding

== Honorary Distinctions ==
Gold Cross of the Order of the Phoenix Athens, 1963

Honorary Distinction from the Hellenic Hematological Society for its Contribution to Progress in Hematology. 5/11/1987

Honorary Distinction from the Society of Medical Studies for its multiple contributions in Medical Education. Athens, 1990

Honorary Distinction from the Hellenic Hematology Society for its contribution. Kavala, 1993

The George P. Englezos Award was awarded to Professor Phaedon Fessas in a deep appreciation and recognition of his long term global contribution to the Thalassaemia problem. 5 April 1997

Honorary Distinction from the Hellenic Society for the Study of Medical Education for its contribution to Medical Science and particularly in Medical Education. Athens, 1999

Honorary Distinction to the initiator, founder and animator of the National Center for Thalassemia, completing its 25 years of operation. Athens, 2000

Honorary Distinction at the 3rd International Conference "Recent Developments on the Diagnosis and Therapy of Endocrine and Metabolic Problems in Thalassaemia ". Athens, 2000

Honorary Diploma from the Hellenic Hematology Society in recognition of offer in Hematology and Society. Athens, 2001 Bronze medal of the Academy of Athens for his therapeutic and research work on the extinction of Thalassemia. Athens, 2001

Honorary name of "Phaidon Fessas" Amphitheater of the Athens School of Medicine, at the Laikon Hospital Athens, 2002 "

"Vassilios Malamos" Prize. Hellenic Society of Internal Medicine, Athens, 2002

Honorary Distinction of the Hellenic Hematology Society Award as "Phaidon Fessas" Athens, 2009

Honorary Distinction from the Hellenic Hematology Society to the founding members for the 50 years of the Society. Athens 2011

Sultan Bin Khalifa Grand International Award, for major lifelong contribution in the field of Thalassemia / Hemoglobinopathies. Abu Dhabi, 2013

== Selected bibliography ==
Peptide analysis of the inclusions of erythroid cells in B–thalassemia. Fessas P, Loukopoulos D, Kaltsoya A. Biochimica et Biophysica Acta (BBA) - General Subjects 124(2):430-432 · 1966

The Distribution of Hemoglobin Types in Thalassemic Erythrocytes. Dimitris Loukopoulos and Phaedon Fessas Journal of Clinical Investigation 44(2):231-40 · 1965

Hemoglobin "pylos": study of a hemoglobinopathy resembling thallassemia in the hterozygous, homozygous and double heterozygous state. FESSAS P, STAMATOYANNOPOULOS G, KARAKLIS A. Blood. 1962 Jan;19:1-22. IF 11,8

Two-dimensional paper-agar electrophoresis of haemoglobin. FESSAS P, KARAKLIS A. Clin Chim Acta. 1962 Jan;7:133-8. IF 2,8

Glucose-6-phosphate dehydrogenase deficiency. A new aetiological factor of severe neonatal jaundice. ’Silent’ β-thalassaemia caused by a ‘silent’ β-chain mutant: the pathogenesis of a syndrome of thalassaemia intermedia. Phaedon Fessas Dimitris Loukopoulos Aphrodite Loutradi‐Anagnostou George Komis British Journal of Haematology 51(4):577 - 583 · 2008 DOXIADIS SA, FESSAS P, VALAES T. Lancet. 1961 Feb 11;1(7172):297-301 IF=47

Demonstration of small components in red cell haemolysates by starch-gel electrophoresis. FESSAS P, MASTROKALOS N. Nature. 1959 May 2;183(4670):1261-2. IF=40

New variant of human foetal haemoglobin FESSAS P, MASTROKALOS N, FOSTIROPOULOS G. Nature. 1959 Jan 3;183(4653):30-1. IF=40

New fast hemoglobin associated with thalassemia. FESSAS P, PAPASPYROU A. Science. 1957 Nov 29;126(3283):1119. IF=37

Inclusions of hemoglobin erythroblasts and erythrocytes of thalassemia. FESSAS P. Blood. 1963 Jan;21:21-32. IF=11,8

Neonatal jaundice in glucose-6-phosphate- dehydrogenase-deficient infants. FESSAS P, DOXIADIS SA, VALAES T. Br Med J. 1962 Nov 24;2(5316):1359-62.

Absence of haemoglobin A2 in an adult. FESSAS P, STAMATOYANNOPOULOS G. Nature. 1962 Sep 22;195:1215-6. IF=40

Serum-cholesterol and thalassemia trait. FESSAS P, STAMATOYANNOPOULOS G, KEYS A. Lancet. 1963 Jun 1;1(7292):1182-3. IF=49

Thalassaemia, Glucose-6-Phosphate Dehydrogenase Deficiency, Sickling, and Malarial endemicity in Greece: a study of five areas STAMATOYANNOPOULOS G, FESSAS P. Br Med J. 1964 Apr 4;1(5387):875-9

Alpha-Chain of human hemoglobin: occurrence in vivo. FESSAS P, LOUKOPOULOS D. Science. 1964 Feb 7;143(3606):590-1.IF=39

Three inherited red-cell abnormalities in a district of Greece. Thalassaemia, sickling, and glucose-6-phosphate-dexydrogenase deficiency. CHOREMIS C, FESSAS P, KATTAMIS C, STAMATOYANNOPOULOS G, ZANNOS- MARIOLEA L, KARAKLIS A, BELIOS G. Lancet. 1963 Apr 27;1(7287):907-9. IF= 49

Peptide analysis of the inclusions of erythroid cells in beta-thalassemia. Fessas P, Loukopoulos D, Kaltsoya A. Biochim Biophys Acta. 1966 Aug 24;124(2):430-2

Hemoglobins of early human embryonic development. Kaltsoya A, Fessas P, Stavropoulos A. Science. 1966 Sep 16;153(3742):1417-8. IF=37

Prenatal diagnosis of beta-thalassemia; the Greek experience. Loukopoulos D, Antsaklis A, Aleporou-Marinou V, Panourgias J, Karababa P, Fessas P. Birth Defects Orig Artic Ser. 1982;18(7):293-301.
