= John Stamatoyannopoulos =

American physician

John A. Stamatoyannopoulos a Greek-American physician-scientist in molecular biology and epigenomics. He was a professor of genome sciences and medicine at the University of Washington, where he led the Stam Lab and led UW Medicine's participation in the ENCODE project. He was terminated from his tenured position in 2022. John is the son of Greek geneticist George Stamatoyannopoulos. Stamatoyannopoulos is the scientific director of the Altius Institute for Biomedical Sciences.

== Academics and career ==
Stamatoyannopoulous attended Stanford University. He received an M.D. from the University of Washington School of Medicine before completing his medical studies at Harvard Medical School. He completed his fellowship in Oncology and Hematology at the Dana Farber Cancer Institute where he was awarded the Howard Hughes Medical Institute Physician postdoctoral fellowship.

In 2005, Stamatoyannopoulos joined the Departments of Genome Sciences and Medicine at the University of Washington. He later served as the principal investigator leading the University's participation in the ENCODE project and as director of the Northwest Reference Epigenome Mapping Center. He was a member of the editorial board of Genome Research and in 2009 was elected to the American Society for Clinical Investigation. In 2015, the National Human Genome Research Institute awarded Dr. Stamatoyannopoulos $10 million to create a new Center of Excellence in Genomic Science, the Center for Photogenomics, with the focus of developing high speed imaging technology to replace traditional DNA sequencing methods.

Stamatoyannopoulos is a member of the ENCODE project, and in 2012 led the international ENCODE consortium in publishing a series of papers in Nature which promoted the significance of regulatory regions within the genome. His ENCODE research provided the first detailed map of gene controlling regulatory DNA and a dictionary of the genome's programming language—instructions written within the DNA.

He served as Professor at University of Washington until his termination in 2022 for violating university policies.
