= Encyclopedia of Public Health =

- Author: Lester Breslow, MD (editor); Bernard Goldstein, Lawrence W. Green, C. Wilhelm Keck, John M. Last. Michael McGinnis (associate editors)
- Language: English
- Subject: Public health
- Genre: Encyclopedia
- Publisher: Macmillan Reference USA
- Publication date: 2002
- Publication place: USA
- Media type: Print
- Pages: 1,480 (4 v.)
- ISBN: 0-02-865354-8
- OCLC: 174081383
- Dewey Decimal: 362.1/03 21
- LC Class: RA423 .E53 2002

The Encyclopedia of Public Health is a reference set of four volumes covering all aspects of public health for the lay reader. It covers infectious diseases and other topics related to public health, such as causes of injury or chronic diseases. The 900 articles are written by experts in this domain.

Topics indirectly related but relevant to public health, such as the oath of Hippocrates, are covered. Controversial subjects are not avoided; an article on armed forces alcohol and drug abuse programs is followed by an article on arms control.

It has received the CHOICE 2002 award for Outstanding Academic Reference Title and has been listed in the Booklist/Reference Book Bulletin Editor's Choice of Outstanding Reference titles.
