= Roemer's law =

Law in health policy

In health policy, Roemer's law may be expressed as "in an insured population, a hospital bed built is a bed filled."

The rule was deduced by the American health services researcher Milton Roemer, working at the UCLA School of Public Health. Roemer and colleagues found a positive correlation between the number of short-term general hospital beds available per 1,000 people and the number of hospital days used per 1,000 people.

Roemer's law will clearly not always hold true (not every bed that is ever built will be filled), but it provides the underpinning for certificate of need laws and for health planning.

The law is thought to be a consequence of induced demand: physicians encouraging patients to consume services that the patients would not have chosen if they had been fully informed. Health planning and certificate of need laws aim to prevent the waste that would otherwise occur because of Roemer's law.

"One problem in this finding is that it could be the case that hospital stays are shorter in lower hospital bed per capita regions because of a deficit in supply (reverse causation). An increased number of beds may be due to patient preference for in-patient (rather than outpatient) care in a region."

Enoch Powell, the British Minister of Health, propounded a similar proposition, which he called Parkinson's law of hospital beds: "the number of patients always tends to equality with the number of beds available for them to lie in."
