= Annual Review of Public Health =

- Discipline: Public health
- Language: English
- Edited by: Jonathan E. Fielding

Publication details
- History: 1980–present
- Publisher: Annual Reviews (United States)
- Frequency: Annually
- Open access: Subscribe to Open
- License: Creative Commons
- Impact factor: 17.2 (2025)

Standard abbreviations
- ISO 4: Annu. Rev. Public Health

Indexing
- CODEN: AREHDT
- ISSN: 0163-7525 (print); 1545-2093 (web)
- LCCN: 80644745
- OCLC no.: 874372619

Links
- Journal homepage

The Annual Review of Public Health is a peer-reviewed academic journal that publishes review articles about public health, including epidemiology, biostatistics, occupational safety and health, environmental health, and health policy. It has had three editors: Lester Breslow, Gilbert S. Omenn, and Jonathan E. Fielding.

The journal is published open access under the Subscribe to Open (S2O) publishing model. According to the 2026 Journal Citation Reports, the journal has a 2025 impact factor of 17.2, ranking it sixth out of 443 journals in the category "Public, Environmental & Occup. Health".

== History ==
Annual Reviews (AR) is a nonprofit organization whose stated mission is to synthesize knowledge "for the progress of science and the benefit of society." AR published the first volume of the Annual Review of Public Health in 1980, in response to a second American "public health revolution". The preface of the first volume noted the shift towards chronic health conditions like cancer and heart disease. It also noted the rising cost of diagnosing and treating disease in the US, which had doubled from 1950 to 1975. The first editor was Lester Breslow.

Initially, the journal was organized into five subtopics, age and disease-specific public health, behavioral aspects of health, environmental health, epidemiology/biostatistics, and health services. In volume 13 (1992), a sixth subtopic was added: public health practice. The five subtopics in volume 15 (1994) were epidemiology and biostatistics, public health practice, behavioral aspects of health, health services, and environmental and occupational health.

In April 2017, AR made the Annual Review of Public Health open access as part of a grant from the Robert Wood Johnson Foundation. By May 2019, usage of the journal had increased eight-fold relative to 2016 to about 200,000 downloads monthly. For comparison, the titles for clinical psychology and medicine that maintained gated access showed no change in usage. Additionally, the audience for the journal increased from 1,100 institutions in 57 countries (2016) to 7,220 institutions in 137 countries (2018). Based on this success, AR created the Subscribe to Open (S2O) publishing model to convert some of its other journals from gated to open access on a year-to-year basis.

== Editorial processes ==
The Annual Review of Public Health is helmed by the editor. The editor is assisted by the editorial committee, which includes associate editors, regular members, and occasionally guest editors. Guest members participate at the invitation of the editor, and serve terms of one year. All other members of the editorial committee are appointed by the AR board of directors and serve five-year terms. The editorial committee determines which topics should be included in each volume and solicits reviews from qualified authors. Unsolicited manuscripts are not accepted. Peer review of accepted manuscripts is undertaken by the editorial committee.

=== Editors of volumes ===
Dates indicate publication years in which someone was credited as a lead editor or co-editor of a journal volume. The planning process for a volume begins well before the volume appears, so appointment to the position of lead editor generally occurred prior to the first year shown here. An editor who has retired or died may be credited as a lead editor of a volume that they helped to plan, even if it is published after their retirement or death.

- Lester Breslow 1980–1990
- Gilbert S. Omenn 1990–1996
- Jonathan E. Fielding 1997–present
