= Charles Epstein (geneticist) =

American geneticist (1933–2011)

- Born: September 3, 1933; Philadelphia, Pennsylvania, US
- Died: February 15, 2011 (aged 77); Tiburon, California, US
- Education: Harvard University (MD)
- Known for: Research in Down syndrome, Unabomber victim
- Spouse: Lois Epstein (m. 1956)
- Scientific career
- Fields: Medical genetics
- Workplaces: University of Washington; University of California, San Francisco; Buck Institute for Age Research
- Academic advisors: Arno Motulsky

Charles Joseph Epstein (September 3, 1933 – February 15, 2011) was an American geneticist who was severely injured in 1993 when he became a victim of a mail bomb attack by the Unabomber. He was a researcher at the University of California, San Francisco and the Buck Institute for Age Research.

== Education ==
He was first in his 1959 class at Harvard Medical School, and then interned at Harvard's Peter Bent Brigham Hospital.

== Career ==
Epstein began his work in medical genetics—the application of genetics research to human care—in a fellowship with Arno Motulsky, one of the founders of medical genetics, at his Seattle University of Washington lab. While there, Epstein worked to understand the nature of Werner's syndrome, a genetic disease that causes premature aging.

He is most notable for conducting groundbreaking research on Down syndrome. In 1967 he became the chairman of the medical genetics division in the pediatrics department of UC San Francisco. He did research on making a mouse model for Down syndrome.

Epstein was the president of the American Society of Human Genetics in 1996 and the editor-in-chief of the American Journal of Human Genetics from 1986 to 1993. (He became the official editor-in-chief on the 1st of July 1986 and was severely injured in June 1993.)

During the last 10 years of his life, Epstein participated in the formation of the Buck Institute located in Novato, California, serving as chairman of its scientific advisory board and board of trustees.

== Unabomber ==
In June 1993, Epstein received a mail bomb sent by Ted Kaczynski, known at the time as the Unabomber. The explosion severed several of Epstein's fingers, caused abdominal injuries, and resulted in a partial loss of his hearing.

== Death ==
Epstein died on February 15, 2011, at the age of 77 after a protracted struggle with pancreatic cancer.

== Works ==
- Search Results for author Epstein CJ on PubMed.
