= Arno Motulsky =

Created and defined the field of medical genetics

- Born: July 5, 1923; Fischhausen, East Prussia, Weimar Germany
- Died: January 17, 2018 (aged 94); Seattle, Washington, U.S.
- Citizenship: German; USA
- Education: Yale University, University of Illinois, Chicago
- Known for: pharmacogenomics
- Spouse(s): Gretel Stern Motulsky, married 1945, died September 17, 2009 (aged 85)
- Awards: William Allan Award (American Society of Human Genetics); McKusick Leadership Award (American Society of Human Genetics); GfH - Medal of Honor
- Scientific career
- Fields: Human genetics, Phamacogenetics
- Workplaces: University of Washington, Seattle
- Academic advisors: Lionel Penrose
- Notable students: Joseph L. Goldstein; David E. Comings; Charles J. Epstein; Judith Hall; Frederick Hecht; Gil Omenn

Arno Gunther Motulsky (5 July 1923 – 17 January 2018) was a professor of medical genetics and genome sciences at the University of Washington. Motulsky is considered a founder of the field of medical genetics. He is also considered the "father of pharmacogenetics", and is credited with coining the term.^{[2]}

== Early life ==
Arno Motulsky was born in Fischhausen near Königsberg, East Prussia to German-Jewish parents, Hermann and Rena (Sass) Motulsky.

As the Nazis consolidated power and adopted antisemitic laws, Arno's father Hermann, a merchant, attempted to resist. Offended by the public display in the town square of Der Stürmer, the virulently antisemitic pro-Nazi newspaper, he forged a letter to the local Nazi Party branch directing them to remove the Stürmer display boxes. The police traced the letter to him and he served time in prison for his dissidence. Hermann was later pressured by the mayor of Fischhausen to sell his store and other property at undervalued prices to an “Aryan” buyer. The family relocated to Hamburg, living off savings as they explored how and when to emigrate.

In June 1938, Hermann was arrested again as part of the Juni-Aktion, a precursor to Kristallnacht. He was imprisoned in Sachsenhausen concentration camp for two months and released on the condition that he leave Germany. He was forced to emigrate without his family in October 1938, bound for Cuba.

At age 15 in 1939 Arno along with his mother and younger siblings, already on a waiting list for a visa to enter US, obtained a landing permit to join his father in Cuba. With more than 900 other Jewish refugees, the family embarked on the ship the MS St. Louis from Hamburg to Havana,

Along with most other passengers, the Motulskys’ permit to enter Cuba was fraudulently sold by corrupt officials, and Cuba did not allow the refugees to disembark. The captain then asked to land in a US port with the refugees, but the US government refused them entry, as did Canada and other Western Hemisphere nations. The St. Louis was forced to head back towards Germany. A few days before the ship was to land again in Hamburg, four countries agreed to take the refugees. By lots, the passengers were divided among England, France, Belgium, and Netherlands. Arno's family was sent to Belgium in June 1939.

The Germans invaded Belgium on May 10, 1940, and 16-year-old Arno was arrested by the Belgians for being a German ‘‘enemy alien.’’ He was separated from his family and spent a year in various internment camps at Saint-Cyprien, Pyrénées-Orientales and Gurs in southwestern France. Days before his 18th birthday, he was able to arrange to leave France in June 1941 bearing an American visa. He disembarked from Lisbon for the United States, where he arrived in August 1941 and reunited with his father in Chicago.

Two years later, Motulsky and his father learned that the remainder of their immediate family were in Switzerland, unharmed. The family was reunited in Chicago in 1946, and changed their surname to Molton: only Arno retained the original family name.

Motulsky met Gretel Stern (born in 1924, also from Germany) in 1943. They married in 1945.

== Education ==
Motulsky had been barred from his primary education in Germany in 1938 due to his Jewish ancestry, and only attended a year of high school in Belgium before the German invasion, but he maintained his studies during his internment and was able to pass high school equivalency tests in America in 1942. Over the next 2 years, he was able to obtain college qualifications by attending classes at night and on Saturdays while working during the week. He was accepted to medical school at the University of Illinois at Chicago in 1943, but was drafted by the U.S. Army. He attended Yale University as part of the U.S. Army accelerated program, where he attended a genetics course taught by Donald Poulson and "was hooked forever". Motulsky briefly served as an orderly at an army hospital before enrolling in medical school at the University of Illinois, Chicago. He earned his medical doctorate in 3 years, in 1947. Motulsky subsequently completed his residency in medicine and fellowship in hematology at the University of Illinois.

== Career ==
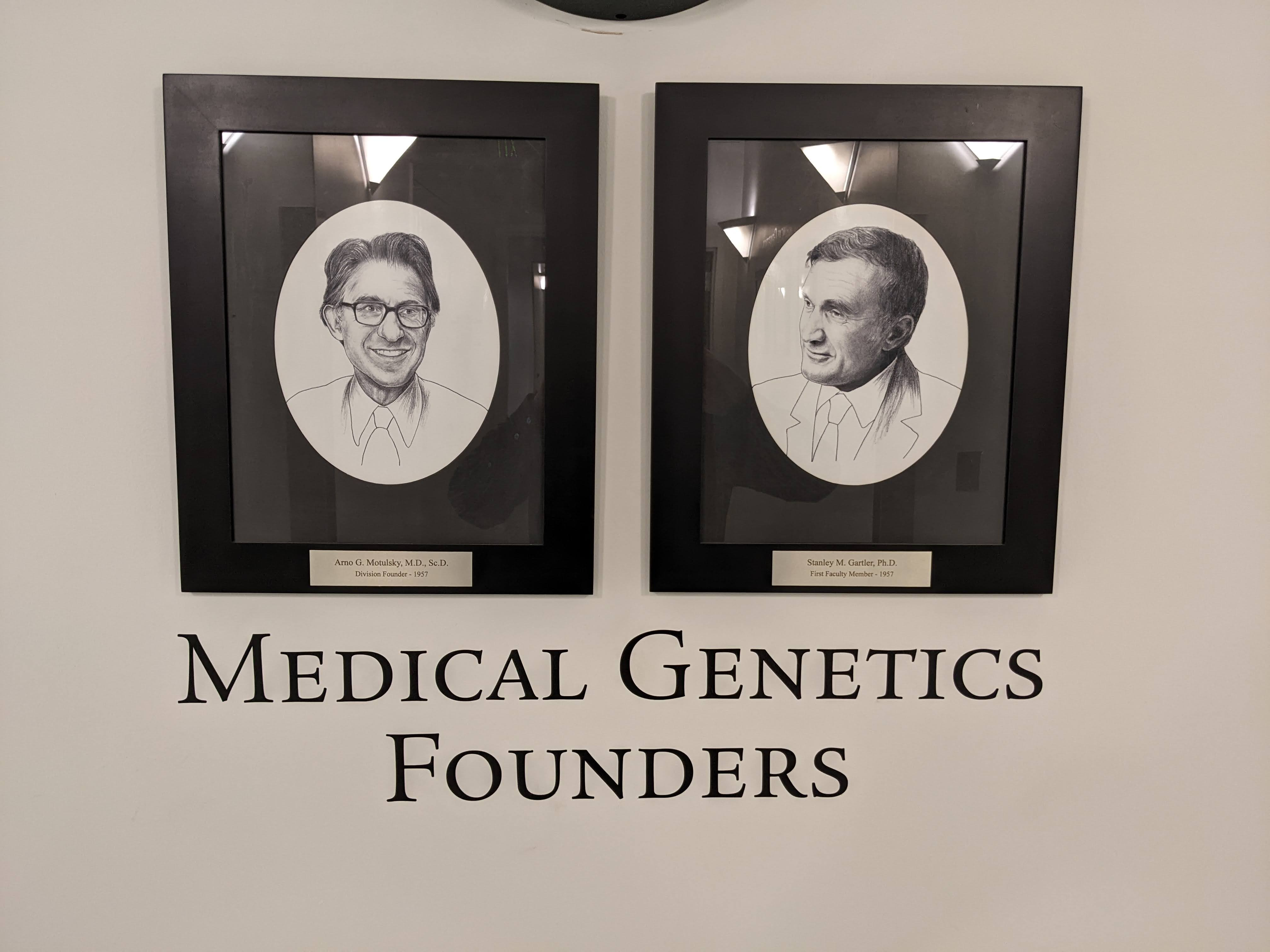
Commemorative plaque honoring the founding members of the University of Washington Division of Medical Genetics, Arno Motulsky and Stanley Gartler

Motulsky's first research efforts were conducted under the supervision of Karl Singer at the Michael Reese Hospital, where he investigated hemoglobinopathies. Subsequent work involved inherited blood disorders, which he conducted at Walter Reed Army Medical Center 1951 to 1953 during service in the U.S. Army.

In 1953, Motulsky joined the faculty of the department of medicine at the University of Washington School of Medicine, where he continued his work on hemoglobiopathies, developing the first techniques for hemoglobin electrophoresis. At the request of the chair of the department, Motulsky established the Division of Medical Genetics in 1957. Recruited by Motulsky that same year, Stanley Gartler became the first person to join the division.

Motulsky's work spanned multiple subject areas he believed would benefit from genetic investigation. Among others, his professional interests were diverse and included studying the genetics of human blood and serum groups, biochemical genetics, the genetics of Werner syndrome, Mendelian and cytogenetic causes of birth defects, ecogenetics, multifactorial diseases, the genetics of glucose-6-phosphate dehydrogenase deficiency, genetic variation in color vision, genetic variation as a risk factor in anesthesia, and the genetics of pesticide metabolism.

In 1957, Motulsky demonstrated that the differential response seen in drug-induced prolonged apnea during suxamethonium anesthesia could be attributed to a pseudocholinesterase deficiency genoytpe. This discovery led him to propose the concept of pharmacogenetics in 1964.

Motulsky was the first to propose that bone marrow transplantation could be used to cure genetic disorders of the hematopoietic system, which his group was the first to practically demonstrate by using transplantation to cure hereditary spherocytosis in a murine model in 1967.

Starting in 1970, Motulsky mentored his trainee Joseph L. Goldstein in investigations of the genetic variability of lipid metabolism. This collaboration led to discovery of the familial inheritance patterns of hyperlipidemia, and provided the first evidence that familial hypercholesterolemia was a monogenic disorder. These were also foundational studies for Goldstein's 1985 Nobel Prize in Physiology or Medicine awarded with Michael Brown, “for their discoveries concerning the regulation of cholesterol metabolism.”

During the 1980s, Motulsky collaborated with colleague Samir Deeb to investigate the genetics underlying color vision, eventually identifying common genetic polymorphisms and structural variants that influence color perception.

During the course of his career, Motulsky mentored many postdoctoral trainees in medical genetics, including Robert Sparks, John Mulvihill, Philip J. Fialkow, Charles Epstein, Frederick Hecht, David E. Comings, Judith Goslin Hall, Gilbert S. Omenn, George Stamatoyannopoulos, George Fraser, Wylie Burke, Ephrat Levy-Lahad, and Joseph L. Goldstein. Many of these trainees went on to establish genetics programs at a number of medical schools.

== Legacy ==
When he was 19, Motulsky wrote a short memoir (in English) of his experiences from 1939 to 1941, and this was published after his death. He also discussed his experiences in a 2 1/2-hour interview with the USC Shoah Foundation, as well as a series of interviews with Deutschlandradio. In 2012, Motulsky was honored in a ceremony by the US State Department for the survivors of the MS St. Louis and diplomats from countries that accepted them as refugees.

He co-wrote his final publication, his autobiography, with Mary-Claire King. Much of this memoir was based on an interview done as part of the Conversations in Genetics series. Obituaries were published in the New York Times, American Journal of Human Genetics, American Journal of Medical Genetics, Genetics in Medicine, the Journal of Clinical investigation, the Lancet, the Scientist, the Pharmacologist, the British Journal of Medicine, the National Academy of Sciences, and UW Medicine.

He was inducted as a member into the National Academy of Medicine, the National Academy of Sciences and the American Philosophical Society.
