= National Health Planning and Resources Development Act =

US law

National Health Planning and Resources Development Act of 1974
- Long title: An Act to amend the Public Health Service Act to assure the development of a national health policy and of effective State and area health planning and resources development programs, and for other purposes.
- Enacted by: the 93rd United States Congress

Citations
- Public law: Pub. L. 93-641
- Statutes at Large: 88 Stat. 2225

Legislative history
- Introduced in the Senate as S. 2994 by Edward M. Kennedy on February 8, 1974; Signed into law by President Gerald Ford on January 4, 1975

The National Health Planning and Resources Development Act, or Public Law 93-641 is a piece of 1974 American Congressional legislation. Many Certificate of Need programs trace their origin to the act which offered incentives for states to implement these programs.

== Details of the Act ==
In this Act, three distinct existing programs were consolidated:

- Hill-Burton
- Regional Medical Program
- Comprehensive Health Planning Act

Congress realized that the provision of federal funds for the construction of new health care facilities was contributing to increasing health care costs by generating duplication of facilities.

The intent of Congress in passing this Act was to create throughout the United States, a strengthened and improved federal-, state- and area-wide system of health planning and resources development that would help provide solutions to several identified problems.

The perceived problems the Act was intended to address were as follows:

- lack of equal access to quality health care at reasonable cost
- infusion of federal funds into the health care system was contributing to inflationary health care costs while failing to produce an adequate supply or distribution of health resources
- the lack of a comprehensive, rational approach by the public and private sectors to creation of uniformly effective methods of delivering health care
- misdistribution of health care facilities and manpower
- increasing and uncontrolled inflation of health care costs, particularly the costs associated with hospital stays
- inadequate incentives for the use of alternative levels of health care and the substitution of ambulatory and intermediate care for inpatient hospital care
- the lack of basic knowledge regarding proper personal health care and methods for effective use of available health services in large segments of the population

This legislation was also intended to encourage health care providers to play an active role in developing health policy.
