= Amy Kelley =

American geriatrician and palliative care specialist

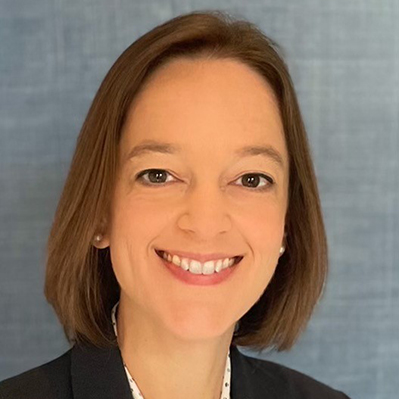
- Education: Cornell University; University of California, Los Angeles
- Scientific career
- Fields: Geriatrics, palliative care
- Workplaces: Icahn School of Medicine at Mount Sinai; National Institute on Aging

Amy S. Kelley is an American geriatrician and palliative care specialist serving as the deputy director of the National Institute on Aging since 2022. She was previously the Hermann Merkin Professor in Palliative Care at the Icahn School of Medicine at Mount Sinai.

== Education ==
Amy S. Kelley earned a M.D. from Weill Cornell Medicine. She later completed a Master of Science in Health Services (M.S.H.S.) from the UCLA Fielding School of Public Health.

== Career ==
Kelley was a professor and vice chair for health policy and faculty development at the Icahn School of Medicine at Mount Sinai. There, she held the Hermann Merkin professorship in Palliative Care within the Brookdale department of geriatrics and palliative medicine. Additionally, she served as the senior associate dean for gender equity in research affairs.

Her research, funded by NIH grants from the National Institute on Aging (NIA), focused on the needs of ill older adults and their families. Kelley conducted studies using data from the Health and Retirement Study (HRS) and National Health and Aging Trends Study (NHATS), often linked with Medicare claims, to analyze treatment intensity and financial burdens faced by individuals with Alzheimer's disease, related dementias, and other serious illnesses. Her findings emphasized the importance of identifying older adults at risk for high healthcare costs and unmet care needs. Dr. Kelley's research also established the definition of serious illness used to define the patient population, who may benefit from palliative care, at the National Institutes of Health, the Centers for Medicare and Medicaid Services, the National Quality Forum, and others.

In 2022, Kelley joined the NIA as deputy director, succeeding Melinda Kelley. Her responsibilities include providing strategic leadership, overseeing daily operations, and managing diversity, equity, inclusion, and accessibility (DEIA) initiatives. In 2024, she became the acting director of the division of neuroscience following the removal of Eliezer Masliah.
