= Subscribe to Open =

Open access academic publishing model

Subscribe to Open decision process

Subscribe to Open (S2O) is an economic model used by peer-reviewed scholarly journals to provide readers with open access (OA) to the journal’s content, without charging costs to authors. S2O converts journals that have a traditional subscription model to open access.

When the academic libraries subscribing to a journal are asked to renew their subscriptions to the journal, they are told that, with the libraries’ support, the journal will be made open access to all readers, while authors are able to publish in it at no cost. If enough libraries renew on these terms, the journal is converted to open access, and if not, access to the journal remains restricted to subscribing libraries.

== Background ==
The term “Open Access” (OA) was first coined in December 2001 in a call for greater access to academic journal articles, which were mainly available through subscriptions. Influential statements such as the Budapest Open Access Initiative (BOAI) in February 14, 2002, have called for improvement of the circulation of research through open access to scholarly journals. Since then, more than twenty financial models have been developed as alternatives to the traditional subscription model, beginning with authors paying article processing charges (APCs) to BioMed Central in 2002.

The Subscribe to Open model was first introduced in 2017 by the publisher Annual Reviews in consultation with Raym Crow and with a grant from the Robert Wood Johnson Foundation. S2O was presented as “a practical approach for converting subscription journals to open access.”

== Operation ==
The Subscribe to Open financial model for open access to peer-reviewed research is based on a mutual assurance contract. Mutual assurance contracts are used to create public goods by securing financial support for such goods. Under S2O, libraries help to create a public good that is universally open to both readers and authors, through subscriptions. “If all libraries continue to subscribe, then not only will those libraries have access to the content for their users, but [the journals] will also make the content openly available to non-subscribers.”

As with the traditional subscription model, S2O journal pricing and subscription options are announced a year in advance for one or more of the following years. If enough academic libraries agree to subscribe under the S2O model, the journal’s content is open to all readers. If the publisher judges that an insufficient number of institutions participate in the S2O offering, content may remain (or return to being) limited to subscribers.

== Advantages and disadvantages ==
Advantages of S2O over other OA publishing models such as 'read and publish agreements', include minimizing disruption, reduced data management and administration, utilizing existing structures such as subscription agencies, and operating within academic libraries' current budgetary commitments.

Some S2O publishers may offer incentives to subscribing libraries for renewing under S2O terms, such as discounted subscription rates or enhanced back-volume availability. Incentives may counter the free-rider sustainability challenge, which can accompany mutual assurance contracts, and is the most commonly expressed concern about S2O’s viability.

S2O is presented not as a donation but as “a categorical business offer within the journal's existing subscription process” that appeals to the libraries’ economic self-interest. In a 2021 survey of academics, including librarians, from 27 countries, 44 percent of respondents felt that “their administrations would allow them to participate in S2O,” while the majority felt more information would be needed before such a move would be approved.

Concerns have also been raised about whether such a model can support increased subscription and financial growth for publishers, whether the model will be vulnerable to rapid changes and budget pressures, how to access publishing support from funding bodies, the potential to launch new journals, and the type of metrics that would be useful to administrators and librarians.

== Impact ==
Introduced in 2017, by 2023, S2O has been employed by 15 publishers, offering over 150 journals under open access. As of 2022, only one publisher had retracted an S2O offer, due to what they judged to be insufficient library support for the model. Publishers, interested librarians, funders, and related organizations have formed the S2O Community of Practice, which among other activities commissioned a survey of academic librarians and others on perceptions of S2O.

In terms of journal readership, the Annual Review of Public Health (ARPH) which was the first title to implement S2O, had an eight-times increase in usage from May 2016 to May 2019. During the same time period usage levels for Annual Reviews’ traditional subscription journals remained relatively unchanged. The number of countries accessing ARPH increased from 57 to 137 during this period. In terms of the model’s perceived value among publishers, a survey of 102 scholarly society publishers, conducted in 2019, concluded that the “transformative agreements, including models such as Subscribe to Open, emerged as the most promising approaches” because “they offer a predictable, steady funding stream.” S2O was noted as being unique in positioning “the publisher as the choreographer of change.”

In searching for a workable open-access model, the International Water Association (IWA) initially experimented with an article processing charge (APC) model for two of its journals, as well as negotiating read and publish agreements. IWA found that although it increased impact, the APC model reduced journal revenue to unsustainable levels. Read and publish agreements were time consuming and difficult to arrange. In 2021, IWA offered all ten of its subscription journals under a Subscribe to Open model. With S2O, IWA met its revenue target to open all its journals and saw an "unprecedented increase" in their usage.

S2O has been endorsed by cOAlition S, a group of national research funders, charitable foundations, and European and international organizations, as providing “a rapid route to open access that is applicable to research from all disciplines and all countries.” S2O has also inspired similar models for monographs and books through MIT Press (Direct to Open, D2O) and the Central European University Press (Opening the Future).

== S2O publishers ==
- Amsterdam University Press
- Annual Reviews
- Berghahn Books
- Brepols
- Bloomsbury
- De Gruyter
- Duncker & Humblot
- EDP Sciences
- EMS Press (European Mathematical Society)
- IWA Publishing (International Water Association)
- Liverpool University Press
- Mathematical Sciences Publishers
- Pluto Journals
- Royal Society
- University of Toronto Press, The Journal of City Climate Policy and Economy (JCCPE)
- Project Muse (Johns Hopkins University Press)
