= Certificate of need =

Legal document in the US

Map of US states that have Certificate-Of-Need laws.

A certificate of need (CON), in the United States, is a legal document required in many states and federal jurisdictions before healthcare providers may construct new facilities, acquire major medical equipment, or expand certain services. CON programs are issued by federal or state health planning agencies or similar bodies, which must determine that a proposed project is needed to serve the community before granting approval.

CON laws originated in New York in 1964 and were encouraged nationwide through federal legislation in 1974. Although the federal mandate was later repealed, as of 2026 approximately 35 states and the District of Columbia maintain CON regulations covering hospitals, nursing homes, ambulatory surgical centers, and various specialized services.

Proponents maintain that CON laws help control healthcare costs and prevent unnecessary duplication of facilities and services. However, multiple empirical studies have found that these regulations reduce the supply of healthcare providers and facilities, limit competition, and are associated with higher prices and fewer choices for patients. Research indicates that CON laws are linked to roughly 48-50% fewer hospitals per capita and approximately 12% fewer beds at typical hospitals. Federal agencies, including the U.S. Department of Health and Human Services, have recommended repealing or substantially reforming CON laws on the grounds that they restrict competition and increase costs without clear offsetting benefits to quality or access. CONs have been blamed for the shortage of hospital beds during the COVID-19 pandemic in the United States.

== History ==
The concept of the CON first arose in the field of health care and was passed first in New York in 1964 and then into federal law during the Richard Nixon administration in 1974, with the passage of the National Health Planning and Resources Development Act. Certificates of need are necessary for the construction of medical facilities in 35 states and are issued by state health care agencies:

The certificate-of-need requirement was originally based on state law. New York passed the first certificate-of-need law in 1964, the Metcalf–McCloskey Act. From that time to the passage of Section 1122 of the Social Security Act in 1972, another 18 states passed certificate-of-need legislation. Section 1122 was enacted because many states resisted any form of regulation dealing with health facilities and services.

All across the United States, there are 35 states as well as Washington D.C. that have CON laws in place. CON laws not only cover proposed facilities and equipment but also a variety of services. As of 2023 there are a multitude of states that have CON requirements on different services such as:

- 31 states that have CON requirements on Psychiatric Services
- 25 states that have CON requirements for Long-Term Acute Care (LTAC)
- 24 states that have CON requirements for Cardiac Catheterization
- 24 states that have CON requirements for Rehabilitation
- 24 states that have CON requirements for Substance/Drug Abuse
- 22 states that have CON requirements for Open Heart Surgery
- 21 states that have CON requirements for Radiation Therapy
- 1 state that has a CON requirement for Subacute Services
- 2 states that have CON requirements for Ultrasounds
- 9 states that have CON requirements for Lithotripsies
- 11 states that have CON requirements for Burn Care
- 13 states that have CON requirements for Renal Failure/Dialysis
- 15 states have CON requirements for Linear Accelerator Radiology
- 18 states have CON requirements for Organ Transplants
- 16 states have CON requirements for Obstetrics Services
- 15 states have CON requirements for Hospice

A number of factors spurred states to require CONs in the healthcare industry. Chief among these was the concern that the construction of excess hospital capacity would cause competitors in an oversaturated field to cover the costs of a diluted patient pool by overcharging, or by convincing patients to accept hospitalization unnecessarily.

In some instances where state and federal authorities overlap, federal regulations may defer authority from the federal agency to the state agency with concurrent authority as to the issuance of a certificate of need. However, deferment of this authority is not required. For example, the Department of Housing and Urban Development (HUD) issued the following determination:

HUD conducts the same analysis of need whether or not the state has a CON process. There is wide variation in the methods CON states use to decide whether or not to issue a certificate. HUD believes that the Act's required need assessment is best performed using a method that is applied consistently to hospitals in all states. Should the state's CON process and HUD's assessment of need reach differing conclusions on the need for a proposed project, HUD will review the case closely to determine if its conclusion should be changed.

CONs are sometimes sold in bankruptcy as an asset, and the CON requirement is sometimes used by competitors to block the reopening of existing hospitals. In June 2023, a Tennessee administrative law judge blocked the opening of a new hospital in Rutherford County by Vanderbilt University. The state had initially approved the hospital and granted it a certificate of need. But three existing providers intervened, claiming that there was not a need for another facility in the area. The 42-bed hospital has been in the works since 2020, with a tentative opening in 2026, if not for the existing providers' objection to the new facility's construction.

In 2018, the Department of Health and Human Services recommended that states repeal their CON laws because they are a significant reason for increasing medical costs, and they reduce patients' healthcare choices.

In June 2019, Florida Governor Ron DeSantis signed House Bill 21 into law, eliminating major portions of Florida’s CON program for hospitals, rehabilitation beds and hospital services, thereby removing many legal barriers to the expansion of health care services across Florida. In May 2023, South Carolina Governor Henry McMaster signed into law the repeal of certificate of need laws in the state.

In March of 2023, North Carolina Governor Roy Cooper signed HB 76 into law. Entitled "Access to Healthcare Options", this law accomplished many things relating to reforming the states CON laws. Some of which include changing the dollar amount expenses that trigger CON documentation requirements on various things such as equipment and diagnostic centers. Under HB 76, some healthcare facilities are completely exempt from CON requirements like chemical dependency treatment facilities and psychiatric facilities.

== Criticism and legal cases ==
Since new hospitals cannot be constructed without proving a "need", the certificate-of-need system grants monopoly privileges to already existing hospitals. Consequently, Alaska House of Representatives member Bob Lynn has argued that the true motivation behind certificate-of-need legislation is that "large hospitals are... trying to make money by eliminating competition" under the pretext of using monopoly profits to provide better patient care. A 2011 study found that CONs "reduce the number of beds at the typical hospital by 12 percent, on average, and the number of hospitals per 100,000 persons by 48 percent. These reductions ultimately lead urban hospital CEOs in states with CON laws to extract economic rents of $91,000 annually".

In 2019, after being lobbied by Michigan's largest hospitals, the state's Certificate of Need Commission attempted to restrict the availability of CAR T-cell cancer therapy to only the largest (predominantly urban) hospitals by classifying CAR T-cell therapy a "new" provision of healthcare that required CON certification, until the legislature overrode the commission. Some political advocacy organizations have blamed CONs for the shortage of hospital beds during the COVID-19 pandemic in the United States.

In 2020, residents of Kentucky seeking to open a new home care agency specifically for Nepali immigrants were denied a certificate of need by the state. The residents challenged the decision in federal court and ultimately, the Sixth Circuit Court of Appeals affirmed a trial court determination that the state's CON law was constitutional. In the summer of 2022, the residents filed a cert petition with the United States Supreme Court, arguing that the Fourteenth Amendment requires more meaningful review of restrictions on the right to engage in a common occupation than the current rational basis standard. However, the petition was denied.

== See also ==
- Roemer's law, which is sometimes used as a justification for certificates of need
