= Lara Cushing =

- Education: University of California, Berkeley
- Occupation: Research scientist
- Scientific career
- Fields: Public health
- Workplaces: University of California, Los Angeles
- Website: https://erg.berkeley.edu/people/lara-cushing/

Lara J. Cushing is an assistant professor of environmental health sciences and holds the Jonathan and Karin Fielding Presidential Chair in Health Equity at the Fielding School of Public Health of the University of California, Los Angeles (UCLA).

Cushing studies exposures to environmental hazards and their relationship to social inequalities involving race and class. She also studies effects on pregnant women and infants. She addresses the health consequences of living near greenspace, urban heat islands, hazardous materials sites, oil and gas drilling sites and exposure to dangerous chemicals in the air and water. She examines the disparate impacts of global climate change, sea level rise and other issues involving environmental justice.

== Career ==
Cushing has a B.S. in molecular environmental biology, an M.P.H. in epidemiology (2011), and a PhD in energy & resources (2015) from the University of California, Berkeley.

From 2016-2020 Cushing was an assistant professor in the Department of Health Education at San Francisco State University. In addition she was a visiting scholar in the Department of Environmental Science, Policy and Management at the University of California, Los Angeles.

As of October 2021, she became an assistant professor of environmental health sciences and the Jonathan and Karin Fielding Presidential Chair in Health Equity at the UCLA Fielding School of Public Health.

== Research ==
Cushing received an EPA STAR Graduate Fellowship (2012–2015) in support of her Ph.D. work, to examine health impacts of climate change and their relationship to race, ethnicity and class in Texas, from an environmental justice perspective.

In addition she was a 2014 Environmental Fellow of the Robert & Patricia Switzer Foundation, and a 2018 JPB Environmental Health Fellow of the Harvard T.H. Chan School of Public Health.

Cushing was a contributing author to the IPCC Fourth Assessment Report (2007) and IPCC Fifth Assessment Report (2014) of the United Nations Intergovernmental Panel on Climate Change (IPCC).

She is interested in analytical methods for epidemiological studies and in developing regulatory frameworks to reduce environmental health disparities. She helped to develop a statewide environmental justice screening tool for use in California: the California Communities Environmental Health Screening Tool or CalEnviroScreen proposed as part of California Senate Bill 535 (2012).

In 2018, Cushing and others published the results of studying California's cap-and-trade program. Evidence from the carbon-trading program between 2011 and 2015 supported concerns that companies would keep emitting. Half of the facilities involved actually increased in-state emissions during the period observed. Facilities in disadvantaged neighborhoods were more likely to increase emissions.

In 2020, Cushing and Jill E. Johnston reported on the potential health impacts on pregnant women of flaring in the Eagle Ford Shale of Texas. Their results showed that women who lived closer to the flares had a 30-50% higher risk of premature birth and lower birth weight than women who did not live near oil and gas wells. In addition, self-identified Latina or Hispanic women were exposed to more flaring and were at higher risk of preterm birth.

== Selected publications ==
- Cushing, Lara J; Chau, Khang; Franklin, Meredith; Johnston, Jill E (1 March 2021). "Up in smoke: characterizing the population exposed to flaring from unconventional oil and gas development in the contiguous US". Environmental Research Letters. 16 (3): 034032. Bibcode:2021ERL....16c4032C. doi:10.1088/1748-9326/abd3d4. ISSN 1748-9326. S2CID 232225505.
- Cushing, Lara; Blaustein-Rejto, Dan; Wander, Madeline; Pastor, Manuel; Sadd, James; Zhu, Allen; Morello-Frosch, Rachel (10 July 2018). "Carbon trading, co-pollutants, and environmental equity: Evidence from California's cap-and-trade program (2011–2015)". PLOS Medicine. 15 (7) e1002604. doi:10.1371/journal.pmed.1002604. ISSN 1549-1676. PMC 6038989. PMID 29990353.
- Cushing, Lara; Morello-Frosch, Rachel; Wander, Madeline; Pastor, Manuel (18 March 2015). "The Haves, the Have-Nots, and the Health of Everyone: The Relationship Between Social Inequality and Environmental Quality". Annual Review of Public Health. 36 (1): 193–209. doi:10.1146/annurev-publhealth-031914-122646. ISSN 0163-7525. PMID 25785890.
- Cushing, Lara; Faust, John; August, Laura Meehan; Cendak, Rose; Wieland, Walker; Alexeeff, George (1 November 2015). "Racial/Ethnic Disparities in Cumulative Environmental Health Impacts in California: Evidence From a Statewide Environmental Justice Screening Tool (CalEnviroScreen 1.1)". American Journal of Public Health. 105 (11): 2341–2348. doi:10.2105/AJPH.2015.302643. ISSN 0090-0036. PMC 4605180. PMID 26378826.
