= Lester Breslow =

American physician (1915–2012)

- Born: March 17, 1915; Bismarck, North Dakota, US
- Died: April 9, 2012 (aged 97); Los Angeles, California, US
- Education: University of Minnesota,
- Children: Norman E. Breslow
- Scientific career
- Fields: Public health
- Workplaces: California State Department of Public Health.

Lester Breslow (March 17, 1915, in Bismarck, North Dakota, USA – April 9, 2012, in Los Angeles, California, USA) was an American physician who promoted public health. Breslow's career had a significant impact. He is credited with pioneering chronic disease prevention and health behavior intervention. His work with the Human Population Laboratory in the Alameda County Study established the connection between mortality and lifestyle issues like exercise, diet, sleep, smoking, and alcohol. He has been called "Mr. Public Health".

Among other positions, Breslow served as president of the American Public Health Association, the Association of Schools of Public Health and the International Epidemiological Association. Breslow served as founding editor of the Annual Review of Public Health from 1980–1990.

== Education ==
Breslow received a B.A. in psychology from the University of Minnesota in 1935, followed by his M.D. in 1938 and M.P.H. in 1941.

While studying to be a psychiatrist in medical school, he worked for a summer in the Fergus Falls Minnesota State Hospital for the Insane. This experience left him discouraged since there was little they could do to treat patients at that time except to keep them out of harm's way. After Breslow returned to medical school for his senior year, he shared his feelings with a friend and faculty member who introduced him to Gaylord Anderson, a new professor of public health. Anderson interested Breslow in a career in epidemiology.

== Career ==
Breslow worked from 1941 to 1943 as a public health officer for the Minnesota Department of Health. During World War II Breslow served in the United States Army as a public health officer on a ship sent to the Pacific.

=== California Department of Public Health ===
After the war, Breslow took a position with the California State Department of Public Health. In 1946 he became the Founding Chief of the Bureau of Chronic Disease Control of the California State Department of Public Health where he introduced innovative programs in the surveillance, prevention, and control of chronic disease that became national models. These included the establishment of the California Tumor Registry in 1947. A voluntary initiative targeting hospitals, the registry is credited with educating doctors, increasing their skills, and improving patient care.

In the 1940s and '50s, Breslow did definitive studies on smoking's harm to human health. President Harry Truman appointed Breslow as Director of the President's Commission on the Health Needs of the Nation, which reported in 1952. Smoking and Health: Report of the Advisory Committee to the Surgeon General of the Public Health Service, published in 1964, drew upon Breslow's research on the links between smoking cigarettes and lung diseases such as cancer.

From 1960-1965, Breslow served as Chief of Preventive Medicine Services of the California State Department of Public Health. From 1965-1968, he was the Director of the California State Department of Public Health. Ronald Reagan, then Governor of California, chose to replace Breslow, a Democrat, due to "philosophical differences" over cuts in medical care for the poor.

Breslow spoke of himself as "a political activist for disadvantaged people." He served as president of the International Epidemiological Association from 1964-1968.

=== University of California, Los Angeles ===
In 1968, Breslow became Professor of Public Health at the University of California, Los Angeles. As of 1970, he became Dean of the Jonathan and Karin Fielding School of Public Health, UCLA.

Also during this time, Breslow served as President of the American Public Health Association from 1968-1969. In 1969, he was elected founding co-president of NARAL Pro-Choice America with Congresswoman Shirley Chisholm. From 1973-1975, he served as President of the Association of Schools of Public Health.

As of 1980, Breslow became professor emeritus at UCLA, continuing to do research and write. Breslow was the founding editor of the Annual Review of Public Health from 1980–1990. He was elected as a fellow of the American Association for the Advancement of Science in 1982, and held that honor at the same time as his son, Norman E. Breslow, who was elected in 1984.

Breslow became chair of the Ad-Hoc Tobacco Prevention Interim Advisory Committee in 1989, and was the vice-chair of the Tobacco Education Oversight Committee for California, 1990–1996. In 1993, he published "California's Proposition 99 on Tobacco, and its Impact". Breslow was appointed to lead the Los Angeles County Public Health Commission in 1997, tasked with reviewing "across-the-board operations of public health".

Breslow was the editor-in-chief of the four-volume Encyclopedia of Public Health (2002). He also published a memoir, A life in public health (2005).

== Research ==
Breslow's work over more than half of a century made a very large impact on the world of public health. He is credited with pioneering chronic disease prevention and health behavior intervention. Among the techniques he employed were multiphasic screening and morbidity surveys. He explored both the etiology of chronic illness and the ecological conditions in which disease occurs.

One of his most famous works is with the Human Population Laboratory in Alameda County where he identified a correlation between various lifestyle issues and mortality. Between 1965 and 1985, Breslow tracked approximately 7,000 adults in a longitudinal study that examined the relationship between mortality rates, health status, social networks, and potentially relevant personal characteristics and behaviors.

Breslow identified seven habits characteristic of healthy people, since referred to as the "Alameda 7": 1) Having never smoked 2) Drinking moderately or not at all (defined as drinking no more than five drinks at one sitting) 3) Sleeping 7–8 hours a night 4) Exercising 5) Maintaining an appropriate body weight for one's height 6) Avoiding snacks 7) Eating breakfast regularly. Breslow's data showed that a 45-year-old with six or more of these healthy habits could expect a lifespan of 11 years more than someone who had three or less of the healthy habits. Breslow and others have developed health risk appraisal scales to assess overall health status (adjusted for age) based on behavioral information.

The Alameda study helped to bring about a broader view of health and disease. It established that a person's health did not depend solely on exposure to disease (a one disease-one cause model) but also to their general susceptibility to disease. The results are in alignment with the World Health Organization's efforts to redefine health as a state of "physical, mental and social well-being."

The Alameda County Study was also the first to look at the impact of social networks on mortality. Degree of social connectedness was found to be a major predictor of mortality risk, as those with more connections to family, friends, and community were likely to live longer.

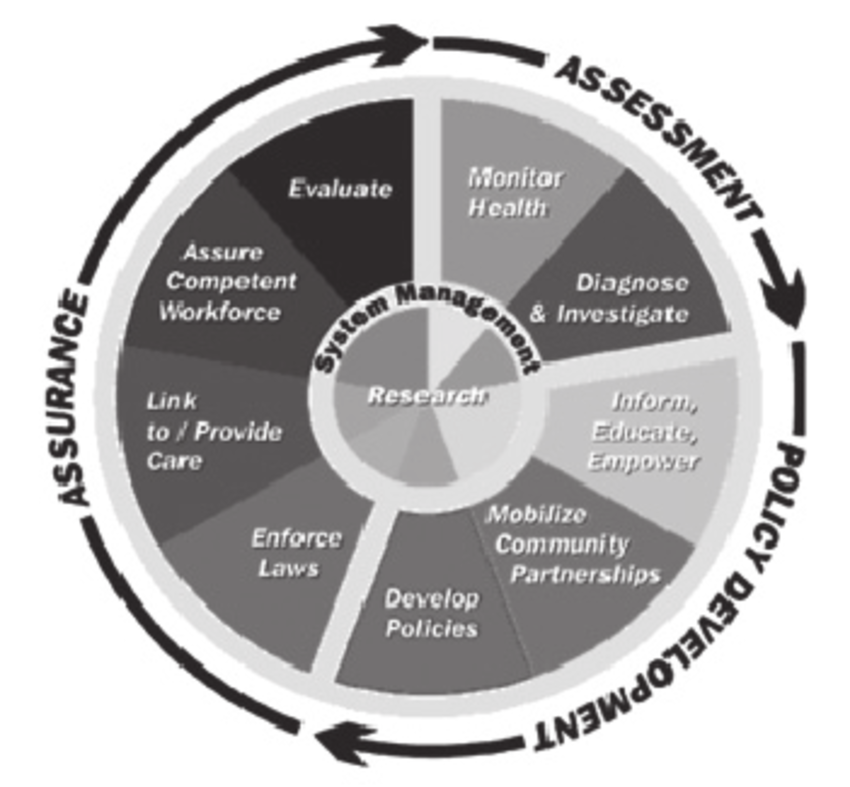
The Ten Essential Public Health Services, 2020

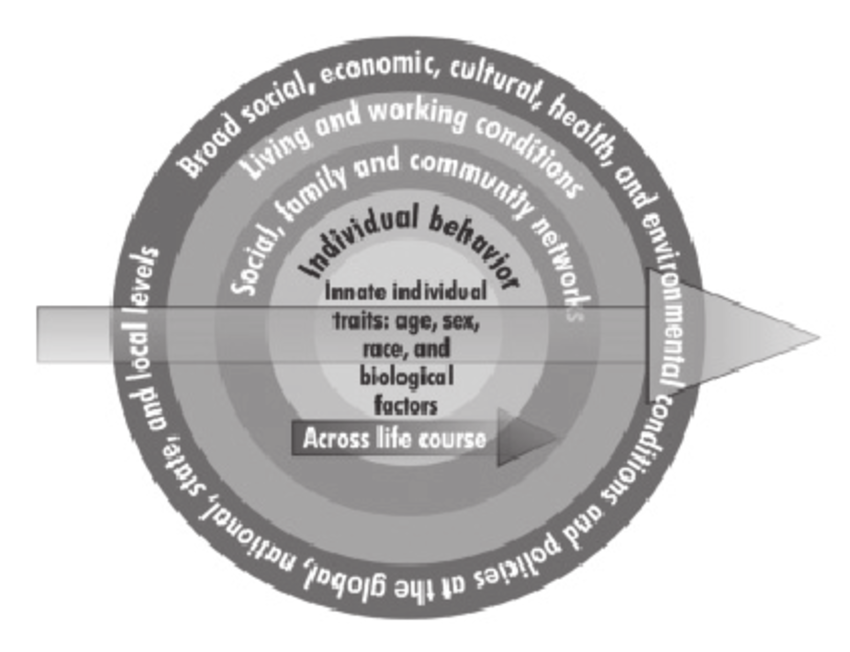
Ecologic Model of Health, 2020

Breslow and others identify two eras in public health, the first focused on communicable diseases and the second on chronic diseases as the leading cause of death. Breslow suggests that a third era would focus on health as opposed to illness, and emphasize the means of promoting well-being and leading satisfying lives. Breslow believed that health should be regarded as a resource for everyday life, as opposed to just a way to prevent disease.

In 2010, he co-authored a paper proposing ways to reorganize the public health system in the United States to more effectively support public health. He and his co-authors identified ten essential public health services which should be seen as part of an "Ecologic Model of Health" in which people are considered in the broad context of their social and physical environments, and interventions are targeted at policies with broad health impacts. Public health is equated with community health.

Breslow was considered an exemplary doctor as well as a genuinely good person. In an obituary written by one of his former protégées it says, "I was one of Lester's preventative medicine residents 15 years ago…Having had an opportunity to observe him engage with 'paupers' and 'kings,' I can attest to his treatment of all with respect and appreciation for their humanity, abilities, and contributions. I can also attest to his refusal to accept anything less than the best, from others (like me!) and particularly, from himself."

== Awards ==
- 1960, Lasker Award, Lasker Foundation
- 1977, Sedgwick Memorial Medal, American Public Health Association.
- 1997, Gustav O. Lienhard Award, Institute of Medicine (IOM)
- 2008, Harold S. Diehl Award, University of Minnesota Medical School

== Selected works ==
- Fielding, Jonathan E.; Teutsch, Steven; Breslow, Lester (2010). "A Framework for Public Health in the United States". Public Health Reviews. 32 (1): 174–189. doi:10.1007/BF03391597. ISSN 2107-6952. S2CID 74015352.
- Breslow, Lester, ed. (2002). Encyclopedia of Public Health. New York: Macmillan Reference USA/Gale Group Thomson Learning. ISBN 0-02-865354-8.
- Breslow, Lester (2005). A life in public health: an insider's retrospective. New York, NY: Springer Pub. Co. ISBN 978-0-8261-2714-3.
- Breslow, Lester (1999). "From Disease Prevention to Health Promotion". The Journal of the American Medical Association. 281 (11): 1030–3. doi:10.1001/jama.281.11.1030. PMID 10086439.
- Breslow, L; Johnson, M (1 May 1993). "California's Proposition 99 on Tobacco, and its Impact". Annual Review of Public Health. 14 (1): 585–604. doi:10.1146/annurev.pu.14.050193.003101. ISSN 0163-7525. PMID 8323603.
- Berkman, Lisa F.; Breslow, Lester (1983). Health and ways of living: the Alameda County study. New York: Oxford University Press. ISBN 978-0-19-503216-1.
- Breslow, Lester; Enstrom, James E. (1 July 1980). "Persistence of health habits and their relationship to mortality". Preventive Medicine. 9 (4): 469–483. doi:10.1016/0091-7435(80)90042-0. ISSN 0091-7435. PMID 7403016.

== Archives ==
- "Guide to the Lester Breslow Tobacco Control Papers, 1989-1994". UC San Francisco::Tobacco Control Archives. Online Archives of California (OAC).
- "Lester Breslow Papers (UCLA)". UCLA::Library Special Collections, Charles E. Young Research Library. Online Archives of California (OAC).
