= Deidra Crews =

American nephrologist and epidemiologist

Academic background
- Education: BSc, biology, 1995, University of Virginia; MD, 2003, Saint Louis University School of Medicine; ScM, clinical epidemiology, Johns Hopkins Bloomberg School of Public Health

Deidra Candice Crew is an American nephrologist and epidemiologist. She is the Deputy Director of Johns Hopkins Center for Health Equity and a Professor of Medicine at Johns Hopkins School of Medicine. Crews research focuses on social drivers of disparities in kidney disease and hypertension.

== Early life and education ==
Crews completed her Bachelor of Arts degree in Biology from the University of Virginia before earning her medical degree at the Saint Louis University School of Medicine. Upon graduating, she received the 2003 John H. Gladney, M.D. Diversity Award. Following her MD, Crews completed her nephrology fellowship and a Master's degree in clinical epidemiology degree at Johns Hopkins School of Medicine. As a senior postdoctoral fellow at Johns Hopkins, Crews was selected as a 2010-2014 Harold Amos Medical Faculty Development Program scholar, sponsored by the Robert Wood Johnson Foundation.

== Career ==
In 2009, Crews joined the Division of Nephrology at the Johns Hopkins University School of Medicine as an instructor. Early in her career she used data from Healthy Aging in Neighborhoods of Diversity across the Lifespan Study to investigate why African Americans with incomes below the poverty line have a significantly higher risk of chronic kidney disease than their white counterparts. She then collaborated with L. Ebony Boulware to develop interventions and strategies to improve dietary choices in the African-American population to help prevent chronic kidney disease. Their work was recognized with an inaugural President's Research Recognition Award in 2012. As an assistant professor of nephrology, Crews continued to receive recognition for her work health, environmental, genetic, historical, cultural, and socioeconomic factors impacting African-American health, longevity, and quality of life. In April 2013, she was named the recipient of the second annual Ernest Just Prize. She also received a K23 award from the National Institute of Diabetes and Digestive and Kidney Diseases for her project "Race, Socioeconomic Status, Diet and Chronic Kidney Disease" through 2017. The following year, Crews was one of many Johns Hopkins faculty members honored with the 2014 Diversity Recognition Award.

Outside of Johns Hopkins, Crews was appointed to the National Kidney Foundation of Maryland Board of Directors in June 2015. She was also inducted into the Alpha Omega Alpha Honor Medical Society in 2017 and appointed to the American Society of Nephrology's executive committee in 2018. At the same time, Crews earned recognition from the National Academy of Medicine as an Emerging Leader in Health and Medicine Scholar for three years. In further recognition of her work, Crews received Johns Hopkins President's Frontier Award as someone who is "poised to break new ground and be leaders in their fields." The following year, she was also named one of the inaugural recipients of the American Society of Nephrology's Distinguished Leader Midcareer Award.

During the COVID-19 pandemic, Crews co-authored articles examining how the novel coronavirus affects those with acute kidney injury. She also sat on a task force that recommended U.S. laboratories discontinue a long-standing clinical standard that factors a patient's race into kidney function tests. Crews' research was recognized at a national level with an election to the American Society for Clinical Investigation in 2020. In January 2021, Crews stepped down as associate vice chair for diversity and inclusion. She then led a successful application for the Mid-Atlantic Center for Cardiometabolic Health Equity alongside Lisa Cooper. The center's aim is to address cardiometabolic health disparities among socially disadvantaged populations across Maryland by testing the effectiveness of several evidence-based strategies.

Crews was elected to the National Academy of Medicine in 2023.
