= George Stamatoyannopoulos =

Greek geneticist

- Γεώργιος Σταματογιαννόπουλος
- Born: 11 March 1934; Athens, Greece
- Died: June 16, 2018 (aged 84)
- Education: University of Athens
- Occupation: Geneticist
- Children: John Stamatoyannopoulos

George Stamatoyannopoulos (Greek: Γεώργιος Σταματογιαννόπουλος; 11 March 1934 – 16 June 2018) was a Greek geneticist who taught at the University of Washington.

Born in Athens on 11 March 1934, Stamatoyannopoulos earned a medical degree and doctorate from the University of Athens. He began teaching at the University of Washington in 1964, and was appointed a full professor in 1973. Stamatoyannopoulos led the Division of Medical Genetics at UW from 1989 to 2005, succeeding the department's founder, Arno Motulsky, who had served since 1957. Stamatoyannopoulos served as president of the American Society of Hematology in 1992, and became the founding leader of the American Society of Gene and Cell Therapy in 1996, which he established because he felt that the American Society of Human Genetics did not fully discuss gene therapy. In 2004, he was made a fellow of the American Academy of Arts and Sciences.

He is the father of John Stamatoyannopoulos, Professor of Genome Sciences at the University of Washington School of Medicine.

Stamatoyannopoulos died on 16 June 2018, at the age of 84, and was buried near Kyparissia.
