= Derrick and Patrice Jelliffe =

Derrick B. Jelliffe (January 20, 1921 – March 18, 1992, in Los Angeles) and his wife Eleanore. F. Patrice Jelliffe (November 29, 1920 – March 16, 2007, in Los Angeles) – known as Dick and Pat Jelliffe – were experts in tropical paediatrics and infant nutrition. They are most known for their seminal book, Human Milk in the Modern World, published by Oxford University Press in 1978, and for editing the multi-volume Advances in International Maternal and Child Health. The Jelliffes also wrote over 500 scholarly papers, often together, and 22 books. They lived and worked in England, Africa, India, the Caribbean and settled in Los Angeles, where he held the Chair in Public Health and Paediatrics at the University of California from 1972 to 1990.

The Jelliffes' field observations triggered the so-called Baby Killers scandal and the Nestlé boycott. Professor Jelliffe subsequently testified to a subcommittee of the US Senate organized by Teddy Kennedy in 1978. He coined the phrase commerciogenic malnutrition to refer to infant starvation caused by inappropriate promotion and use of infant formula or bottlefeeding in areas with low income and poor water supplies. He is associated with the protection, support and promotion of breastfeeding.

Other areas associated with their research include the changing composition and properties of human milk, the contraceptive effects of breastfeeding, and the use of breastfeeding for rehydration and other issues for infant refugees. Dr Charlotte Neumann of the UCLA School of Public Health has commented that Dr. Jelliffe was the hero of all in international nutrition and health – he played a pivotal role in bringing pediatrics to Africa. Derrick Jelliffe was awarded the Wihuri International Prize in 1979. In 1982, Derrick Jelliffe received an honorary doctorate from the Faculty of Medicine at Uppsala University, Sweden. Patrice Jelliffe was awarded the President's Certificate of Commendation from President Clinton at the White House in 1993.

== Selected books ==
- Human Milk in the Modern World: Psychosocial, Nutritional and Economic Significance (Paperback),(June 1979) ISBN 0-19-264921-3
- The Uniqueness of Human Milk (Paperback - Jan 1, 1971)
