= Proto =

Proto or PROTO may refer to:

== Language ==
- Proto-, an English prefix meaning "first"

== Media ==
- Proto (magazine), an American science magazine
- Radio Proto, a radio station in Cyprus

== Music ==
- Proto (Holly Herndon album), 2019
- Proto (Leo O'Kelly album), 2002
- Proto (band), a progressive rock band from Memphis, Tennessee

== Organizations ==
- Proto (tools), a tool company (formerly Plomb Tools), now a division of Stanley Black & Decker
- Proto Motors, a South Korean sports car manufacturer and refitter
- Proto Records, a British record company active in the 1980s; see Barry Evangeli
- Proto (paintball), a paintball equipment manufacturing company

== People ==
- Non-fictional
  - Frank Proto (born 1941), American composer and bassist
  - Ludovic Proto (born 1965), French boxer
  - Neil Thomas Proto (born 1945), American lawyer, teacher, lecturer, and author
  - Silvio Proto (born 1983), Belgian goalkeeper
  - Proto (see Protus and Hyacinth), Christian martyr during the persecution of Valerian I
- Fictional
  - Proto, one of the Nereids in Greek mythology
  - Proto (Ghost in the Shell), a fictional character in Masamune Shirow's Ghost in the Shell anime and manga
  - Proto, a more advanced prototype of the Prophetbot from the video game OneShot
  - Proto Man, a character in the Mega Man franchise

== Science and technology ==
- Proto-, the prefix, as used in taxonomy.
- Siebe Gorman Proto, a type of rebreather breathing set
- SEAT Proto, concept cars
- PROTO (fusion reactor)

== See also ==
- Protos (disambiguation)
