= Albert Folch Folch =

Spanish bioengineer (born 1966)

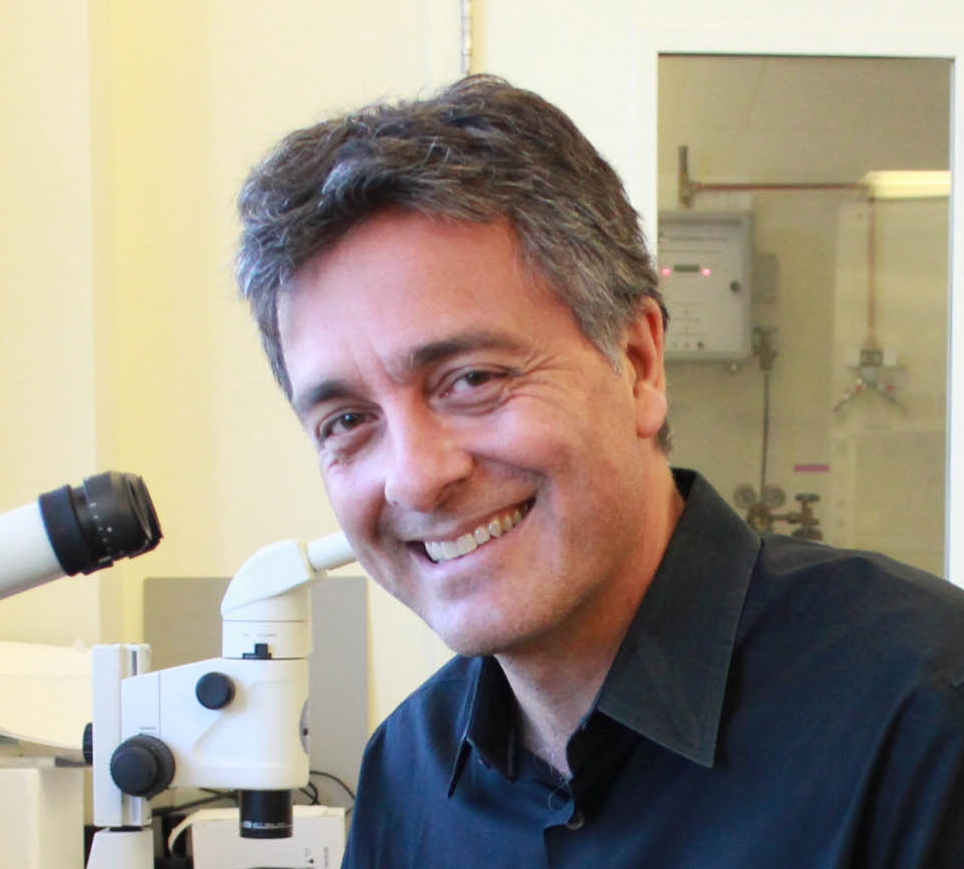
- Born: September 25, 1966 (age 60); Barcelona, Catalonia, Spain
- Education: University of Barcelona
- Known for: Microfluidics, BioMEMS, Scientific Art.
- Awards: NSF CAREER Award (2000), NASA's Space Act Award (2006), AIMBE College of Fellows (2015), Member of the Science&Technology Section of the Institute for Catalan Studies (Institut d’Estudis Catalans, Catalonia, Spain) (2022)
- Scientific career
- Fields: Bioengineer
- Workplaces: University of Washington (Seattle), M.I.T., Harvard
- Doctoral advisor: Javier Tejada (University of Barcelona, Physics Dept.)
- Other academic advisors: Martin A. Schmidt, Mehmet Toner

Albert Folch Folch (/foʊk/ FOHK; born September 25, 1966) is a Spanish/Catalan scientist, writer, and artist. He is the son of editor Xavier Folch and sinologist Dolors Folch and he is the great-nephew of biochemist Jordi Folch Pi. He is currently a professor in the Department of Bioengineering at the University of Washington who is known for his research into Microfluidics and BioMEMS as well as for his works of scientific art.

== Background ==
Folch received his B.Sc. in Physics from the University of Barcelona (U.B.) in 1989. In 1994, he received his Ph.D. in Surface Science and Nanotechnology from the U.B.'s Physics Dept. under Javier Tejada's supervision. During his Ph.D. he was also a visiting scientist (1990–91) at the Lawrence Berkeley Laboratory (Berkeley, California) working on atomic force microscopy under Miquel Salmeron. From 1994 to 1996, he was a postdoc at M.I.T. developing microdevices under the advice of Martin A. Schmidt (EECS Dept.) and Mark S. Wrighton (Chemistry). In 1997, he joined the laboratory of Mehmet Toner as a postdoc at Harvard University's Center for Engineering in Medicine to work on BioMEMS and Tissue Engineering. In 2000 he joined the University of Washington's Dept. of Bioengineering (Seattle), where he is a full professor. In 2001 he received a National Science Foundation CAREER Award, and in 2014 he was elected to the American Institute for Medical and Biological Engineering (AIMBE) College of Fellows Class of 2015. In 2022, he was elected Corresponding Member of the Science&Technology Section of the Institute for Catalan Studies (Institut d’Estudis Catalans, Catalonia, Spain), one of highest honors bestowed upon Catalan scientists. He has served on the advisory board of the BioMEMS journal Lab on a Chip since 2006 and on the editorial boards of Technology and Micromachines since 2013 and 2019, respectively.

== Scientific research and teaching ==
The Folch Lab works on the interface between microfluidics and cancer. The lab develops microfluidic devices to test multiple cancer drugs on a small, live, intact tumor biopsy at high fidelity in order to help doctors decide which drug is most efficacious. The lab also develops 3D printing approaches to make microfluidic devices as easy to use as smartphones and make them easily available to clinicians in order to enable novel cancer diagnostics and therapies.

As part of the undergraduate and graduate curriculum of the University of Washington's Bioengineering Department, Folch has taught a course on BioMEMS from 2001-2024 that led to his textbook Introduction to BioMEMS (CRC Press, 2012) and a course on Cancer Biosensors since 2015.

== Artistic activity ==
The Folch Lab produces microscopy images of microchannels and cells that it then uses to run an artistic outreach program called "BAIT", short for "Bringing Art Into Technology". The micrographs act as baits to entice people to read the accompanying texts (the science) displayed next to the images. Hence, the visitors of the exhibit enjoy the art and leave having learned some science via an artistic experience. While a few of the micrographs are exhibited as obtained by the students without much modification, most pieces are collages, mosaics, and/or mixed-media montages (containing actual devices) made by Folch. However, Folch considers each piece a "collaboration" between him and his students (who are always credited by name, as in a scientific publication).

BAIT now consists of a free online gallery (with more than 1,000 images), a YouTube channel, and more than 60 printed or framed pieces. BAIT has produced six major exhibits. The largest exhibit was at the University of Washington's Allen Library in 2010. In 2013, BAIT was exhibited in the halls of the 2013 Biomedical Engineering Society meeting in the Seattle Convention Center. In 2014, six pieces from BAIT were exhibited during the Mahato Memorial at Duke University, the first time that BAIT was invited outside of Seattle. BAIT has been featured twice on TV (UWTV in January 2012 and NTN24 in November 2014).

Folch's artistic activity extends into graphic design. He has designed the logo for the University of Washington's Bioengineering Department and Folch Lab's art has been used in a number of brochures of scientific venues.

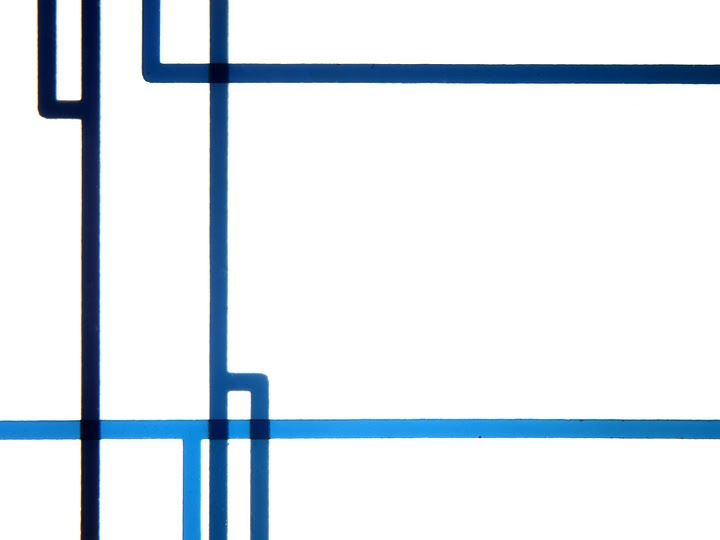
The day that Mondrian visited the lab. By Chris Sip and Albert Folch.

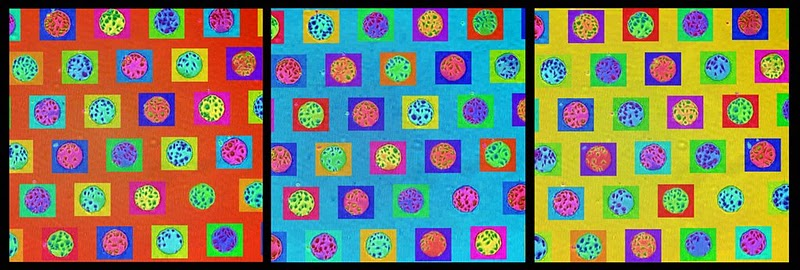
Paul Klee's autopsy. By Anna Tourovskaia and Albert Folch.

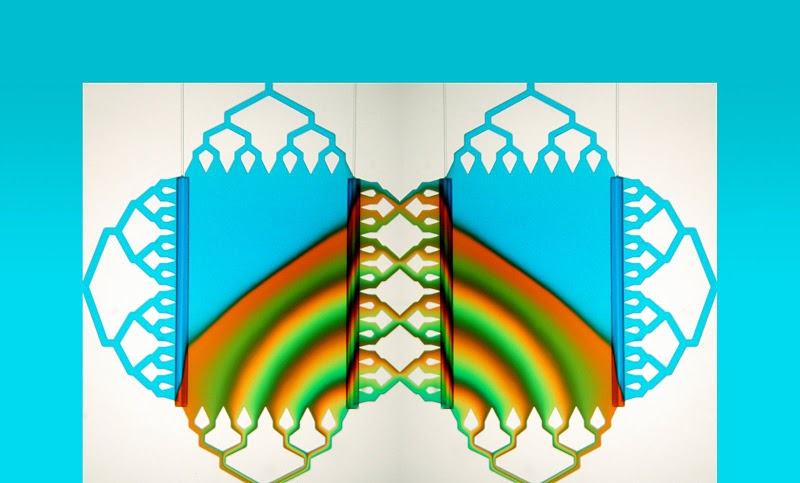
Microfluidic Butterfly. By Greg Cooksey and Albert Folch.

Logo of the UW BioE department. By Albert Folch.

== Literary activity ==
Folch has written a total of six books, comprising two general science books in Catalan (translated titles: Caught on the Internet and The Science in Soccer), a textbook in English (Introduction to BioMEMS), a book about soccer in English (For the Love of the Ball), a microfluidics book in English (Hidden In Plain Sight - The History, Science, and Engineering of Microfluidic Technology), and a general-public microfluidics book also in English (How the World Flows - Microfluidics from Raindrops to Covid Tests).

- Caught on the Internet (Editorial Empuries, 1997) teaches what the Internet is about to computer-illiterate audiences, starting from bits and bytes and ending with issues such as social fairness and hackers. This book is in its second edition and an extract of it is used in a textbook for Catalan middle schoolers.
- The Science in Soccer (Editorial Empuries, 2004) uses soccer examples to convey science. The book is organized in chapters related to various soccer subjects ("The ball", "The field", "The player", etc.). Inside each chapter we find the answers to questions such as what it would be like to play soccer in each of the planets of the Solar System, why the ball is more than one meter ahead of where we think it really is in a 100 km/h kick (due to delays in the transmission of the nervous impulse), or why soccer balls are made of 12 pentagons and 20 hexagons, etc. Folch has used examples from this book to give outreach lectures to high-schools, middle-schools and elementary schools.
- Introduction to BioMEMS (CRC Press, 2012) covers the whole breadth of Bio-MEMS (Biomedical MicroElectroMechanicalSystems), including classical microfabrication, microfluidics, tissue engineering, cell-based and non-cell-based devices, and implantable systems. This textbook has now been adopted worldwide (~100 departments in 18 countries).
- For the Love of the Ball (Amazon, 2013) tells the history and methods of FC Barcelona's youth academy. Folch kept a related blog site during 2014-2017, titled La Ciencia del Fútbol, where he talked about FC Barcelona's state of affairs with a scientific perspective.
- Hidden In Plain Sight (MIT Press, 2022) describes the development and use of key microfluidic devices, explaining not only the technology but also the efforts, teams, places, and circumstances that enabled these inventions.
- How the World Flows (Oxford University Press, 2025) acts like a microscope that pulls the reader into the barely noticeable, Lilliputian world of fluids at small scales--the microfluidic world-and answers the question "What is microfluidics?" in non-technical language.

Folch also created a large Catalan Poetry Selection. This webpage, originally hosted by M.I.T. and manually typed in 1995 just one year after the World Wide Web started, was, at the time, the first online literary resource of its kind and size in any language. Still widely visited, the selection features 800 poems and 176 Catalan poets spanning ten centuries, including 24 unpublished poets.

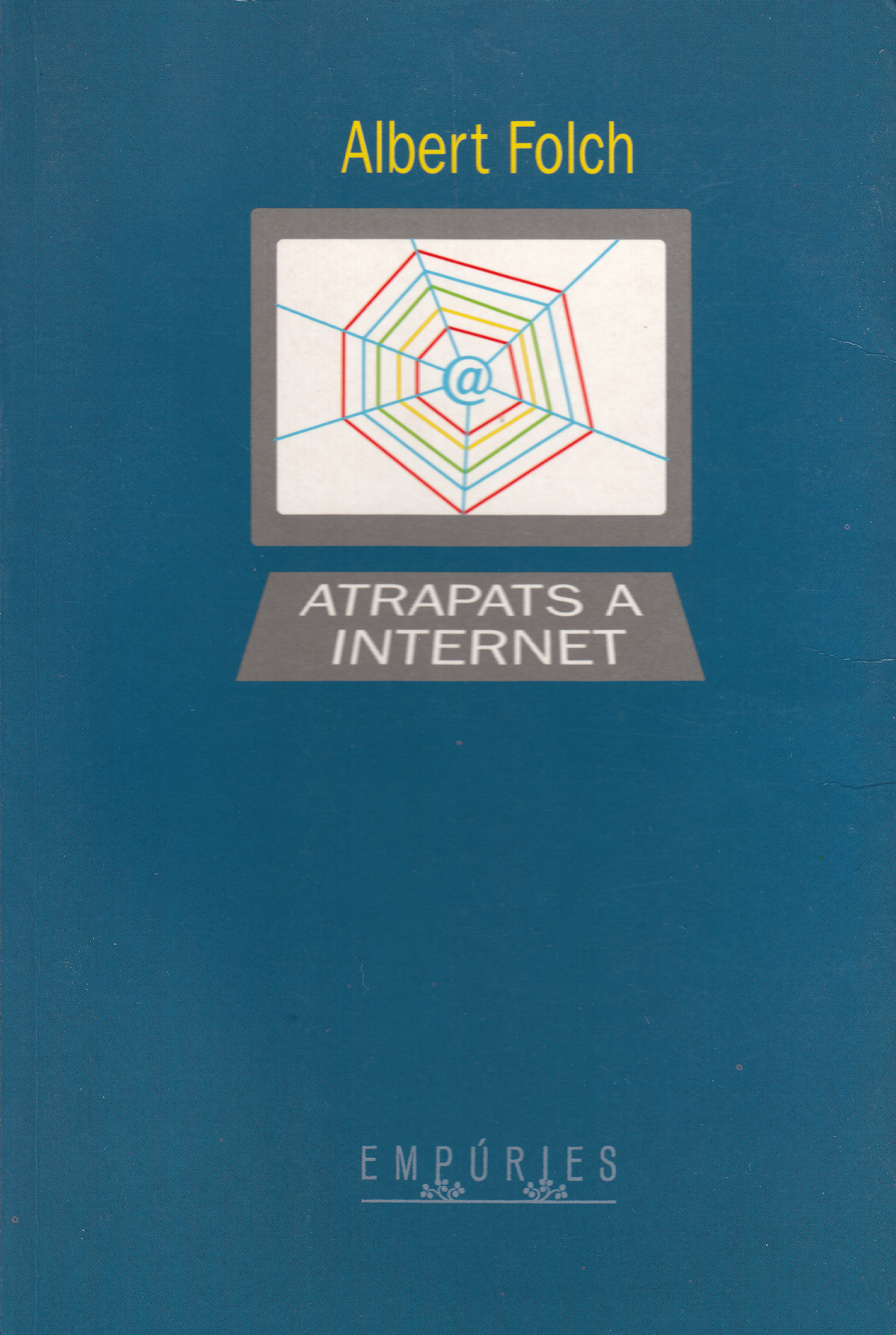
Atrapats a Internet ("Caught on the Internet", 1997)

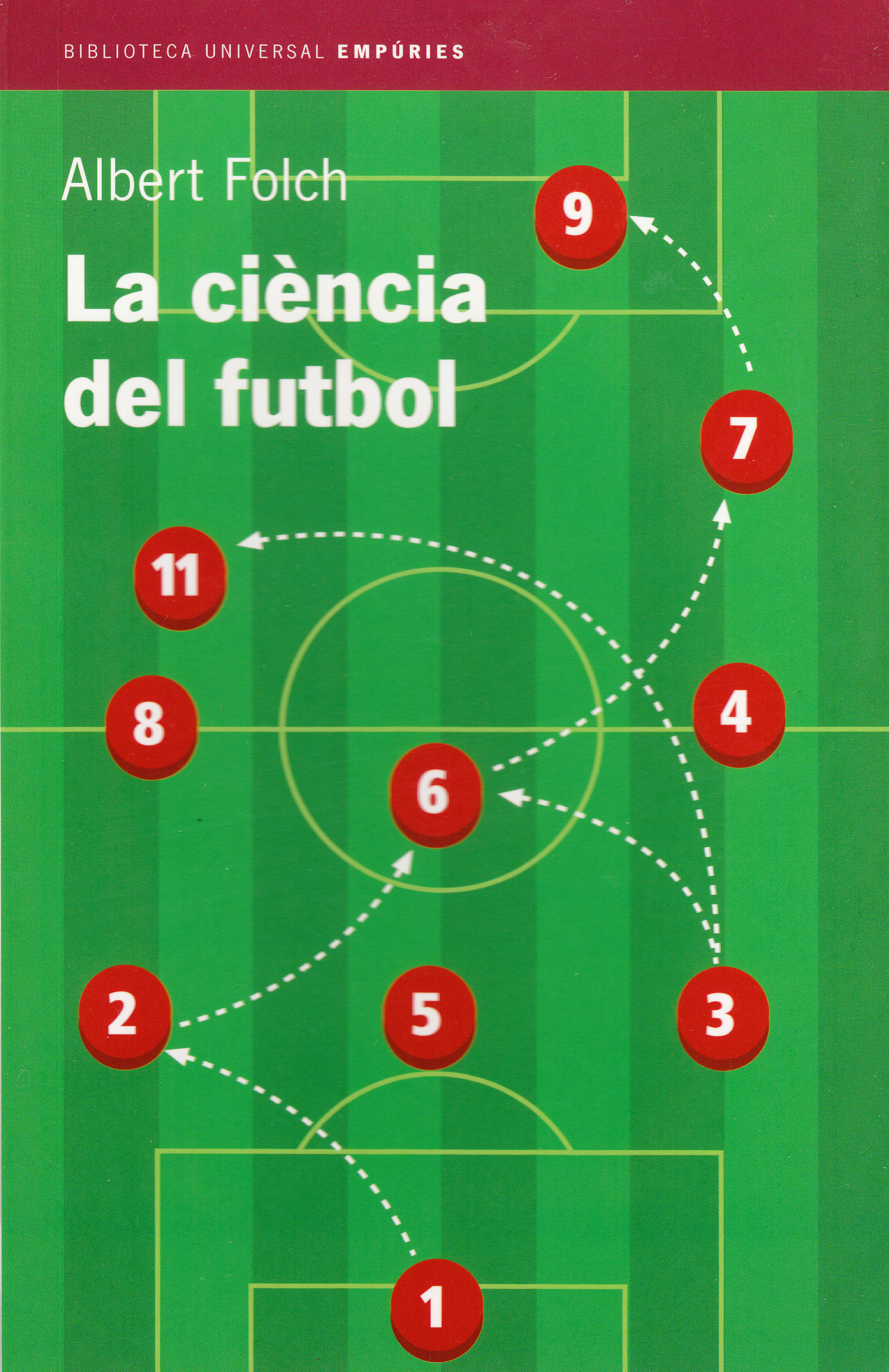
La Ciència del Futbol ("The Science in Soccer", 2004)

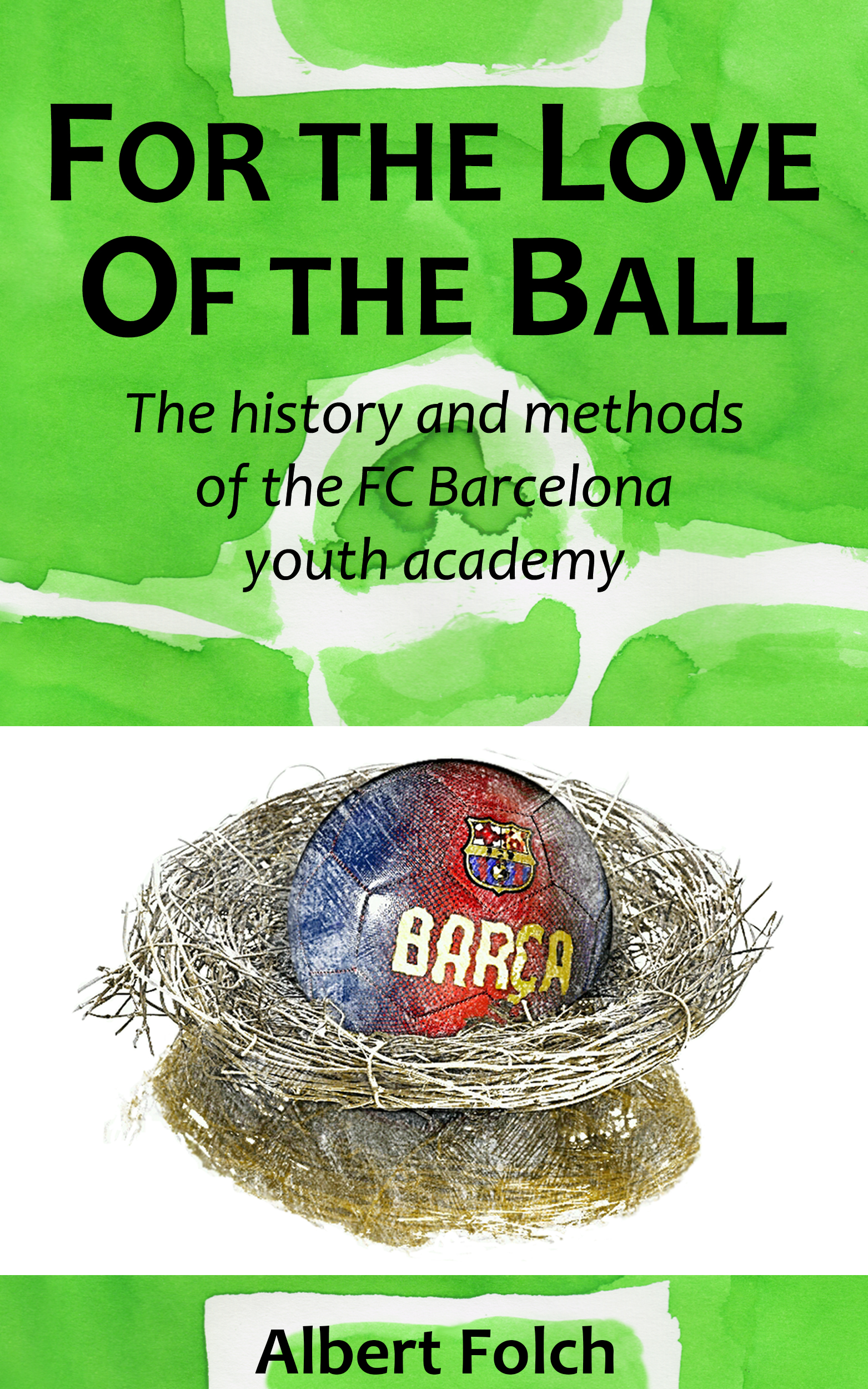
For the love of the ball (Amazon, 2013)

== Media coverage ==
The Folch Lab has been featured in The New York Times (February 2, 2003, Technology section), Science News (February 15, 2003 issue), Physics World (March 2003 issue), Materials Today (April 2003 issue), Photonics Spectra (April 2003 issue), BioPhotonics International (May 2003 issue), Proto (Fall 2008 issue), The Washington Post (October 28, 2008, Health section), UWTV (January 2012), NTN24 (November 2014). New Zealand magazine The SpinOff (15/2/2017 article), YouTube interviews by ElveFlow (July 2017) and by BIOS / Frontier Science (December 2021).

== Awards and honors ==
- 2000 NSF CAREER Award
- 2014 AIMBE College of Fellows Class of 2015
- 2022 Elected Corresponding Member of the Institute for Catalan Studies (Institut d’Estudis Catalans, Catalonia, Spain), Science&Technology Section
- 2026 Chosen by Choiseul España for the Choiseul 100 Global (2026 Edition), a list of 100 Spanish researchers, academics, and scientific leaders.

== Exhibits ==
- 2009 Art exhibit at the Harborview Medical Center (March 2009).
- 2009 Art exhibit at the University of Washington's Meany Theater (September 2009 – September 2010).
- 2010 Art exhibit at the University of Washington's Allen Library (November 2010 – March 2011).
- 2013 Art exhibit at the 2013 Biomedical Engineering Society Meeting (Seattle, October 2013)
- 2014 Art exhibit at Duke University's 2014 Mahato Memorial
