= Haiyin Sun =

Chinese-American optical engineer

Haiyin Sun is a Chinese-American optical engineer, scientist and author.

== Career ==
Dr. Sun has worked as a senior-level optical engineer or manager at L3 Technologies, Coherent, Oplink Communications etc.

He has expertise in optical lens design and optical engineering, laser parameter measurement, mathematical modeling, laser diode application, laser diode physics, and laser beam control.

== Technical achievements ==
Sun has designed and developed advanced optical systems used in chemical detection, fingerprint identification, infrared hyperspectral imaging, threat detection, fire control, self-driving car Lidar, AI applications, laser beam shaping, laser wavemeters, and various imaging cameras.

He extended the thin lens equation to accurately describe real laser beams.

He discovered an error in using Newton's rings to calculate lens surface radius of curvature and derived the correct equations.

== Publications ==
Sun has published on optical engineering, optical lens design and laser diode optics, including over forty journal articles, and seven books and one book chapter that are:

- Sun, Haiyin (2026). Non-Sequential Optical Design using Zemax OpticStudio®: Design Process and Practical Examples. Bellingham, Washington: SPIE Press.
- Sun, Haiyin (2026). Design Method of Refractive Flat-Top Laser Beam Shapers Using Zemax OpticStudio® Sequential Raytracing. Bellingham, Washington: SPIE Press.
- Sun, Haiyin (2018). Basic Optical Engineering for Engineers and Scientists. SPIE Press. ISBN 978-15-106-2205-0.
- Sun, Haiyin (2016). Lens Design: A Practical Guide. Taylor & Francis. doi:10.1201/9781315181448. ISBN 978-14-987-5052-3.
- Sun, Haiyin (2015). A Practical Guide to Handling Laser Diode Beams. SpringerBriefs in Physics. Bibcode:2015pghl.book.....S. doi:10.1007/978-94-017-9783-2. ISBN 978-94-017-9782-5.
- Sun, Haiyin (2012). Laser Diode Beam Basics, Manipulations and Characterizations. SpringerBriefs in Physics. Bibcode:2012ldbb.book.....S. doi:10.1007/978-94-007-4664-0. ISBN 978-94-007-4663-3.
- Sun, Haiyin (2025). Field Guide to Optical Engineering. SPIE Press. ISBN 978-15-106-8556-7.
- Sun, Haiyin (2014). Laser Output Measurement | 52 | v2 | Measurement, Instrumentation, and. doi:10.1201/b15664-52. ISBN 978-13-152-1744-4.

== Patents ==
Sun is a co-inventor of two patents in the fields of optics and laser technology.

- Diode-laser line-illuminating system US 6478452, issued 2002-11-12
- An improved diode-laser-based illumination system US 6612719, issued 2003-09-02

== Awards and recognition ==
Sun is the recipient of 2025 SPIE Rudolf and Hilda Kingslake Award in Optical Design. This award is issued once a year to an individual in recognition of significant achievement in the field of optical design, including the theoretical or experimental aspects of optical engineering. Sun's award citation states that "In recognition of four decades of contributions to optical design, including engineering and measurements, laser-diode applications, optical-literature publications, and service to the optical-design community".

In 2018, he was elected a Fellow of SPIE, the International Society for Optics and Photonics.

He serves as a Senior Editor of Optical Engineering (journal).

One of his research works was reported by Photonics Spectra.
