= Martha Gray =

American biomedical engineer

- Citizenship: United States
- Education: Michigan State University BS '78 Massachusetts Institute of Technology MS '81, PhD '86
- Known for: Delayed gadolinium-enhanced magnetic resonance imaging of cartilage
- Awards: 2007 Kappa Delta Elizabeth Winston Lanier Award, 2011 ORS Women's Leadership Forum Award
- Scientific career
- Fields: Biomedical engineering Computer science
- Workplaces: Massachusetts Institute of Technology

Martha Gray is a biomedical engineer and professor at the Massachusetts Institute of Technology, jointly appointed in the Department of Electrical Engineering and Health Sciences and Technology (HST). Gray became the first woman to lead a department of science or engineering at MIT when she became the co-director of the Harvard–MIT Program of Health Sciences and Technology in 1987. She has developed multidisciplinary programs at MIT. Her research focuses on understanding and preventing Osteoarthritis, and her team developed the imaging technology dGEMRIC, now used to examine cartilage.

== Early life ==
Martha Gray was raised in the Detroit area with three sisters and one brother. Her mother was a nurse and her father was an engineer. In high school, she thought her career might be as a nursery school or elementary school teacher.

Martha Gray received her BS degree in computer science from Michigan State University in 1978, SM degree in electrical engineering from the Massachusetts Institute of Technology in 1981, and PhD in medical engineering through the Harvard–MIT Program of Health Sciences and Technology in 1986. She then completed her postdoctoral work at Tufts University and the State University of New York, Stony Brook.

== Career ==
Gray joined the Harvard-MIT Program of Health Sciences and Technology (HST) faculty in 1987 and became co-director of the department in 1995, joining Joseph Bonventre, making her the first woman to lead a science or engineering department at MIT. During Gray's term as director of HST, the faculty was expanded from 5 to over 60 members, initiatives such as the Biomedical Enterprise Program and the Graduate Education in Medical Sciences were started, and the Biomatrix mentoring program was established for undergraduate students interested in studying health sciences. Gray held the co-director position until July 1, 2008.

In 2010, Gray became the founding director of the Madrid-MIT M+Vision Consortium. This program brings together "leaders in science, medicine, engineering, business, and the public sector dedicated to catalyzing change in Madrid's healthcare innovation ecosystem by accelerating translational research and encouraging entrepreneurship." In 2014, the program was recognized by the Spanish Foundation for Technology and Health "for its contributions to healthcare technology innovation and economic development in Spain. And most recently, Gray is the program director of the IMPACT program at MIT, established in 2016. The IMPACT program seeks to provide post-doctoral students with mentorship so their work can have the most impact on society, by focusing on the societal value of one's work and improving communication to the public.

Gray's biomedical research has focused on arthritis, as she had a longstanding interest in connective tissue in joints, and in the causes of tissue degeneration, whether they are genetic or environmental. Early experiments involved applying mechanical forces to cartilage tissue ex-vivo and observing the effects to cells. From there Gray moved into cartilage imaging technology. Frequently, X-rays would be used to evaluate the condition of cartilage, but cartilage doesn't show up on an X-ray image. Instead, doctors judge by the distance between bones, which do appear from the X-ray, to evaluate the state of the cartilage between them. Inspired by a colleague's work in cardiac imaging, Gray worked with them and developed Delayed gadolinium-enhanced magnetic resonance imaging of cartilage (dGEMRIC).

== Societies and awards ==
Gray is a member of the following societies and associations.

- Fellow, American Association for the Advancement of Science
- Fellow, American Institute for Medical and Biological Engineering
  - Vice President at Large (2007–2009)
  - Chair, College of Fellows (2005–2006)
- Fellow, Biomedical Engineering Society
  - Treasurer (2009–2011)
- Associate Editor of the Annual Review of Biomedical Engineering
- Orthopedic Research Society
  - Secretary (2008–2011)

Gray was the recipient of the 2007 Kappa Delta Elizabeth Winston Lanier Award and the 2011 ORS Women's Leadership Forum Award both from the American Academy of Orthopedic Surgeons. Additionally, the Harvard-MIT HST department annually gives the Martha Gray Prizes for Excellence in Research.

== Personal life ==
Gray lives in Arlington, MA, with her husband and three children.
