= Mehmet Toner =

Turkish biomedical engineer (born 1958)

- Born: 1958 (age 67–68); Istanbul, Turkey
- Education: Istanbul Technical University; Massachusetts Institute of Technology; Harvard–MIT Division of Health Sciences and Technology
- Awards: American Institute for Medical and Biological Engineering; National Academy of Inventors; National Academy of Engineering; National Academy of Medicine; Mustafa Prize
- Scientific career
- Fields: Cryobiology, biomedical Engineering
- Workplaces: Harvard Medical School; Massachusetts Institute of Technology; Massachusetts General Hospital
- Doctoral advisor: Ernest G. Cravalho
- Notable students: Albert Folch; Sangeeta Bhatia; Alexander Revzin

Mehmet Toner (born 1958) is a Turkish biomedical engineer. He is currently the Helen Andrus Benedict Professor of Surgery at Massachusetts General Hospital (MGH) and Harvard Medical School, with a joint appointment as professor at the Harvard-MIT Division of Health Sciences and Technology (HST).

Toner is a co-founder and Associate Director of the Center for Engineering in Medicine (CEM) at MGH and Director of the Biomedical Engineering Research and Education Program at MGH. He is one of the Senior Scientific Staff of the Shriners Hospital for Children. He is the founding director of the National Institute of Health's BioMicroElectroMechanical Systems or BioMEMS Resource Center at MGH.

Toner has made contributions to the fields of cryobiology and biopreservation and to the wider field of biomedical engineering. He has developed techniques in microtechnology and nanotechnology for use in clinical medicine, including the treatment of cancer. He has been elected to the American Institute for Medical and Biological Engineering (AIMBE), the National Academy of Inventors (NAI), the National Academy of Engineering (NAE), and the National Academy of Medicine.

== Early life and education ==
Toner was born in Istanbul, Turkey in 1958. He obtained his Bachelor of Science in mechanical engineering at the Istanbul Technical University in 1983, and his master's degree in mechanical engineering at MIT in 1985. Next Toner studied medical engineering with Ernest G. Cravalho at the Harvard–MIT Division of Health Sciences and Technology (HST), completing his Ph.D. in 1989. He completed postdoctoral work under Maish Yarmush and Ronald G. Tompkins at MGH.

== Career ==
In 1990 Toner joined the faculty of Massachusetts General Hospital (MGH) and became an assistant professor in biomedical engineering at Harvard Medical School. He became an associate professor in 1996, and a professor in 2002. He is jointly appointed as a professor of health sciences and technology for the Harvard–MIT Program in Health Sciences and Technology.

In 1995 Toner co-founded the Center for Engineering in Medicine (CEM) at MGH together with Maish Yarmush. becoming its associate director. That year, he also founded the Biomedical Engineering Research and Education Program at MGH, becoming its director. In 2004, he became founding director of the NIH BioMicroElectroMechanical Systems (BioMEMS) Resource Center at MGH.

In 1999, Toner helped to found the Annual Review of Biomedical Engineering, serving as associate editor. As of 2021, Toner became co-editor of the Annual Review of Biomedical Engineering, sharing the position with Martin L. Yarmush.

== Research ==
Toner's early work focused on understanding cellular injuries during cryopreservation and finding optimum strategies for cell preservation. Toner developed a theory of intra-cellular ice formation while completing his PhD in Medical Engineering at the Harvard-MIT Division of Health Sciences and Technology at Massachusetts Institute of Technology (MIT). As part of that work, he proposed acetylated trehalose as a novel cryoprotectant.

Toner's later work includes bio-sensing, regenerative medicine, and tissue engineering. He has helped to develop microelectromechanical and microfluidic devices for point-of-care detection of cancer, AIDS, genetic defects and infectious diseases. He has received awards for the development of the CTC-chip, a microchip which can isolate and detect circulating tumor cells in peripheral blood. During the COVID-19 pandemic, Toner worked with scientists at several institutions to develop a fast, reliable test for SARS-CoV-2 virus.

== Awards and memberships ==
- 2025, Mustafa Prize
- 2019, Member, US National Academy of Medicine (NAM)
- 2017, Member, US National Academy of Engineering (NAE)
- 2016, Fellow, US National Academy of Inventors (NAI)
- 2010, Dana-Farber/Harvard Cancer Center Thoracic Oncology Research Team Award, American Association for Cancer Research (AACR)
- 2010, Rock Stars of Science, GQ Magazine and Geoffrey Beene Foundation
- 2008, Breakthrough Award, Popular Mechanics
- 1999, Fellow, American Institute for Medical and Biological Engineering (AIMBE)
- 1997, John F and Virginia B Taplin Faculty Fellow Award Faculty Fellow Award, Harvard University and Massachusetts Institute of Technology
- 1995, Whitaker Foundation Special Opportunity Award
- 1994, Y. C. Fung Faculty Award in Bioengineering, American Society of Mechanical Engineers (ASME) (intra-cellular ice formation)
