= Mustafa Prize =

The Mustafa Prize
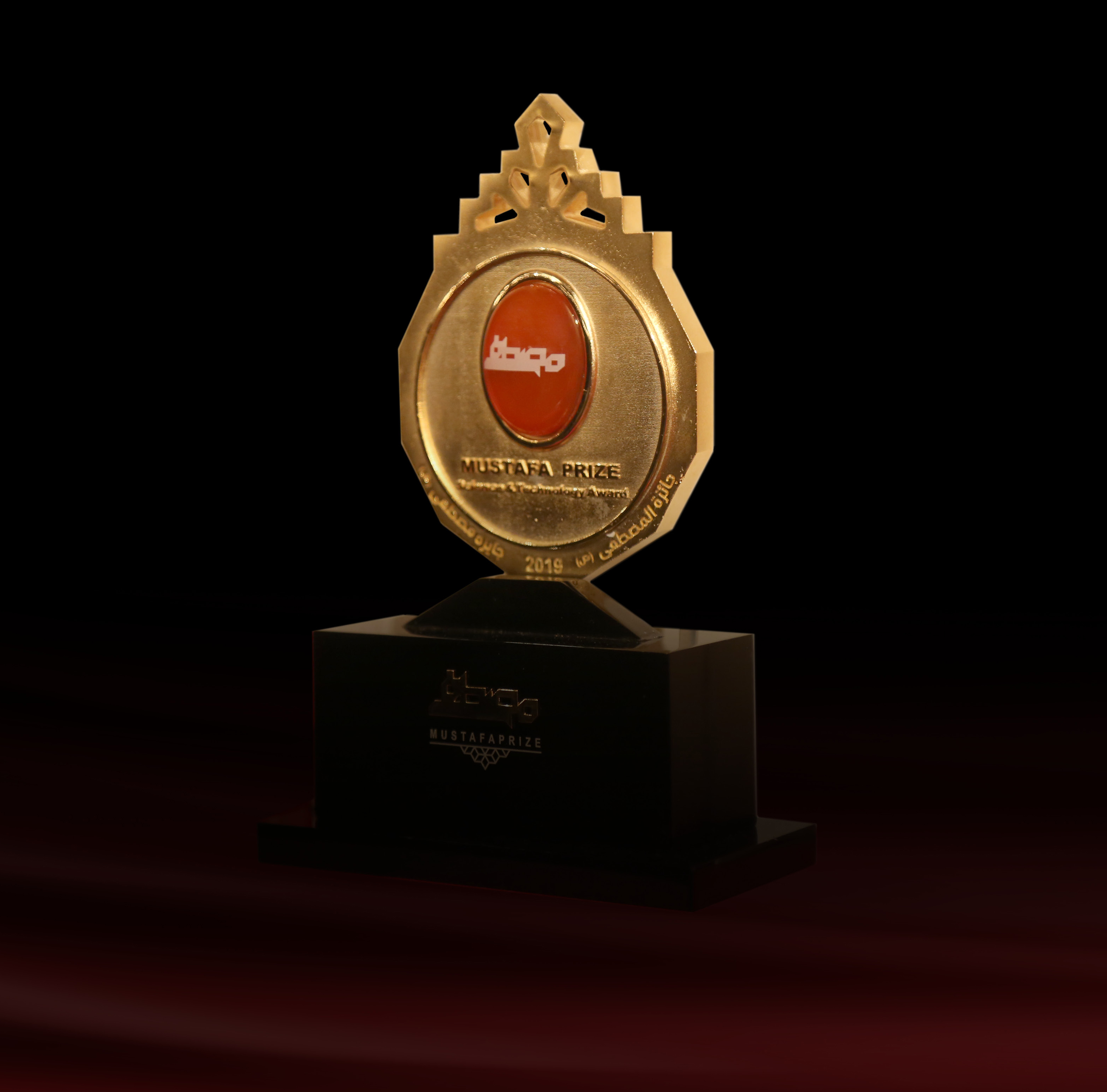
- Mustafa prize medal
- Awarded for: A top scientific achievement that has played a considerable role in the human life or has expanded the boundaries of our understanding of the world.
- Presented by: Mustafa Science and Technology Foundation
- First award: 2015
- Website: mustafaprize.org

The Mustafa Prize is a science and technology award, granted to top researchers and scientists from the Organisation of Islamic Cooperation (OIC) member states. The prize is granted to scholars of the Islamic world as one of the symbols of scientific excellence in recognition of the outstanding scientists and pioneers of scientific and technological cooperation and development in the world. The science and technology $500,000 prize, Medal, and Diploma are awarded to Muslim researchers and scientists, regardless of whether they live in Muslim-majority nations or elsewhere, as well as non-Muslim scientists in Muslim countries. In 2016, Science journal called the prize, the Muslim Nobel.

The Mustafa Prize is held biennially during the Islamic Unity week in Iran. The prize is awarded in the four categories of "Information and Communication Science and Technology," "Life and Medical Science and Technology," "Nanoscience and Nanotechnology," and "All Areas of Science and Technology". These areas include the following UNESCO fields of education: natural sciences, mathematics, and statistics; information and communication technologies; engineering, manufacturing, and construction; agriculture, forestry, fisheries and veterinary; health and welfare as well as cognitive science and Islamic economics and banking.

== History, governance, and nominations ==
The Mustafa Prize is biennially given by Iran's government to leading researchers and scientists from countries of the Organization of Islamic Cooperation. The inaugural prize was given in 2016.

The Mustafa Science and Technology Foundation has formed several committees to organize the Mustafa Prize. The Mustafa Prize Policy-Making Council was established in 2013. Its secretary said in 2017 that the prize and its governing bodies had no formal political relations with any country. The MSTF Advisory Board is composed of volunteer high-rank academics, public sector officials, technologists, and business leaders from the Islamic community who will advise and recommend the MSTF at a strategic level and help it in achieving its objectives through promoting public awareness, fundraising, and networking. Other communities created to achieve the goals of Mustafa Foundation are Safir Al-Mustafa Club, Mustafa Prize Volunteers Community, The Mustafa Art Museum, the MSTF Laboratory Network, and the MSTF innovation labs. Nature interpreted the establishment of the prize as growing importance of domestic science in Iran and the nurturing of scientific cooperation and exchange with other nations.

For the first Information and Communication Science and Technology, Life and Medical Science and Technology, and Nanoscience and Nanotechnology, the nominees should be citizens of one of the 57 Islamic countries with no restrictions on religion, gender and/or age. However, for the category "All Areas of Science and Technology," only Muslims may be nominated with no restrictions on citizenship, gender and/or age. Nominations maybe made by scientific centers and universities, science and technology associations and centers of excellence, academies of science of Islamic countries, and science and technology parks.

== Laureates ==
Name	Affiliation	Year	Category
(United States) Omar M. Yaghi	Co-Director of Kavli Energy Nanosciences Institute and faculty member of University of California, Berkeley	2015	Nanoscience and Nanotechnology
(United States) Jackie Yi-Ru Ying	Executive Director of the Institute of Bioengineering and Nanotechnology of Singapore	2015	Bio Nanotechnology
(France) Sami Erol Gelenbe	Professor of Electrical and Electronic Engineering at Imperial College London, United Kingdom, and a member of the Science Academy of Turkey	2017	Information and Communication Science and Technology
Amin Shokrollahi	Professor of Mathematics and Computer Science at EPFL, and Founder, President, and CEO of Kandou Labs, Lausanne, Switzerland	2017	Information Theory
(United States) Ali Khademhosseini	Professor of Bioengineering, Chemical Engineering, and Radiology at University of California at Los Angeles (UCLA), USA	2019	Life & Medical Science and Technology
Uğur Şahin	Professor of Immunology at University of Mainz, Germany and the director of the TRON institute	2019	Life & Medical Science and Technology
Ümran İnan	President of Koç University, Emeritus Professor of Electrical Engineering at Stanford University	2019	Ionospheric and Atmospheric Physics
Hossein Baharvand	Professor of Stem Cells and Developmental Biology at Royan Institute, Iran	2019	Stem Cell Biology
Mohammad Abdolahad	Faculty Member of School of Electrical and Computer Engineering at University of Tehran, Iran	2019	Nano Electronic Science and Technology
(United States) Cumrun Vafa	Hollis Professor of Mathematics and Natural Philosophy at Harvard University	2021	Theoretical Physics
(United States) (Bangladesh) M. Zahid Hasan	Eugene Higgins Professor of Physics at Princeton University	2021	Quantum Physics
(Lebanon) Mohamed El. Sayegh	Professor of Medicine and Immunology at American University of Beirut	2021	Medicine
(Morocco) Yahya Tayalati	Professor of Physics at Mohammed V University	2021	Theoretical and Particle Physics
(Pakistan) Muhammad Iqbal Choudhary	Directore of the International Center for Chemical and Biological Sciences	2021	Bio-organic Chemistry
(Canada) Ahmed E. Hassan	Professor at Queen's University	2023	Information and Communication Science and Technology
(United States) Omid Cameron Farokhzad	Professor of Anesthesiology at Harvard Medical School	2023	Life and Medical Science and Technology
(Lebanon) Samia J. Khoury	Professor at American University of Beirut	2023	Life and Medical Science and Technology
Murat Uysal	Professor at New York University Abu Dhabi	2023	Information and Communication Science and Technology
Ahmad Fauzi Ismail	Professor at University of Technology Malaysia	2023	Basic and Engineering Sciences
Vahab Mirrokni	VP at Google Research	2025	Information and Communication Science and Technology
(United States) Mehmet Toner	Andrus Benedict Professor of Surgery at Massachusetts General Hospital and Harvard Medical School	2025	Life and Medical Science and Technology
Mohammad Khaja Nazeeruddin	Professor at EPFL	2025	Basic and Engineering Sciences

== See also ==
- List of general science and technology awards
