= Omid Cameron Farokhzad =

Iranian-American physician and entrepreneur

- Born: 1969 (age 56–57); Tehran, Iran
- Citizenship: United States
- Education: University of Massachusetts; Boston University; Massachusetts Institute of Technology
- Awards: Ellis Island Medal of Honor National Academy of Inventors
- Scientific career
- Fields: Nanomedicine, Medical Nanotechnology
- Workplaces: Brigham and Women's Hospital, Harvard Medical School, Seer, Inc.

Omid Farokhzad (Persian: امید فرخزاد; born 1969) is an Iranian-American physician, scientist, inventor, and biotechnology executive. His work has focused on nanomedicine and proteomics, including nanoparticle technologies for targeted drug delivery and protein analysis. He is the chair and chief executive officer of Seer, Inc., a proteomics company that develops tools for large-scale protein analysis. He previously held appointments at Harvard Medical School and Brigham and Women's Hospital, where he founded the Center for Nanomedicine, and he has co-founded biotechnology companies that translate academic research into clinical and commercial applications.

== Early life and education ==
Farokhzad was born in Tehran, Iran, and later immigrated to the United States. He received a B.S. from University of Massachusetts Boston, and M.D. and M.A. degrees from Boston University School of Medicine. He completed postdoctoral research training at the Massachusetts Institute of Technology in the laboratory of Robert S. Langer, and completed residency and fellowship training in anesthesiology and pain medicine at Brigham and Women's Hospital, a teaching affiliate of Harvard Medical School. He later received an Executive M.B.A. from the MIT Sloan School of Management, and an honorary Master of Arts (A.M.) from Harvard University conferred upon his appointment as professor.

== Academic career and research ==
Farokhzad held faculty appointments at Harvard Medical School from 2004 to 2020, most recently as a professor. He was also a principal investigator at Brigham and Women’s Hospital, where he founded the Laboratory of Nanomedicine and Biomaterials (2004) and later the Center for Nanomedicine (2016). His research has focused on nanomedicine, targeted drug delivery, and proteomics, with applications in oncology, neurodegenerative diseases, inflammatory disease, and cardiovascular disease.

Farokhzad is listed as an inventor on more than 250 issued patents and patent applications worldwide. He is a Fellow of the National Academy of Inventors. He has published more than 200 scientific papers and has been named a Clarivate Highly Cited Researcher every year from 2014 to 2025.

Farokhzad has previously served as an Associate Editor of ACS Nano and on the editorial board of other journals.

== Biotechnology entrepreneurship ==
In parallel with his academic career, Farokhzad has co-founded and led biotechnology companies focused on translating academic research into clinical and commercial applications.

BIND Therapeutics (founded 2007) developed targeted nanoparticle drug delivery technologies, including the investigational agent BIND-014 for prostate cancer, which was evaluated in Phase 2 clinical trials.

Selecta Biosciences (founded 2008) developed nanoparticle-based immunomodulation technologies, including the investigational program SEL-212 for gout, which was licensed to Sobi and evaluated in Phase 3 trials. In September 2025, Sobi reported that the U.S. Food and Drug Administration had accepted its biologics license application (BLA) for SEL-212.

In 2017, Farokhzad co-founded Seer, Inc., a proteomics technology company developing nanoparticle-based tools for large-scale protein analysis. Seer launched the Proteograph Product Suite in 2021.

In 2020, he co-founded PrognomiQ, a diagnostics company developing blood-based multi-omics tests; he has served as chair since its founding. PrognomiQ launched ProVue Lung in November 2025 as a laboratory-developed test (LDT) for early detection of lung cancer.

== Awards ==
- 2023 — Mustafa Prize Award (Life and Medical Sciences)
- 2018 — National Academy of Inventors (Fellow)
- 2016 — Ellis Island Medal of Honor
- 2015 — Scientific American Worldview 100
- 2014 — Golden Door Award (International Institute of New England)
- 2013 — RUSNANOPRIZE
- 2012 — AIMBE College of Fellows
- 2012 — EY Entrepreneur of the Year (Northeast Region)

== Philanthropy ==
Farokhzad and his wife, Shadi Aryanpour-Farokhzad, have provided funding through the Farokhzad Family Charitable Fund to organizations and programs in education, healthcare, and the arts. These include the Farokhzad Math Center at Milton Academy, the Shadi and Omid Farokhzad Professorship in the School of Humanities and Sciences at Stanford University, and the Farokhzad Family Distinguished Chair for Innovation at Brigham and Women's Hospital.
