= Jackie Yi-Ru Ying =

American nanotechnology researcher

- Born: April 30, 1966 (age 60); Taipei, Taiwan
- Education: Cooper Union (BEng); Princeton University (MA, PhD)
- Children: 1 daughter
- Awards: Singapore Women's Hall of Fame; Mustafa Prize (2015); Turkish Academy of Sciences Prize (2018); Fellow AAAS (2015); Fellow NAI (2017); Fellow NAE (2021); King Faisal Prize (2023)
- Scientific career
- Fields: Nanotechnology
- Workplaces: Massachusetts Institute of Technology; Institute of Bioengineering and Nanotechnology
- Thesis: "Structural evolution of sol-gel derived ceramics during sintering" (1991)
- Academic advisors: Herbert Gleiter

Jackie Yi-Ru Ying (born 30 April 1966) is a Taiwanese-born American nanotechnology scientist based in Singapore. She is the founding executive director of the Institute of Bioengineering and Nanotechnology (IBN).

== Early life and education ==
Ying was born in Taipei on April 30, 1966. She moved to Singapore with her family in 1973 as a child where she was a student at Rulang Primary School and Raffles Girls' School. She then went to New York City, earning a B.Eng. degree, summa cum laude, from Cooper Union in 1987. She then attended Princeton University, receiving her M.A. in 1988 and her Ph.D. in 1991, both in chemical engineering. She spent a year as a Humboldt Fellow at the Institute for New Materials in Saarbrücken and researched nanocrystalline materials with Herbert Gleiter.

== Career ==
Ying became a professor in the Department of Chemical Engineering at the Massachusetts Institute of Technology (MIT) in 1992. She was made a full professor in 2001; at 35 she was one of MIT's youngest full professors.

Ying returned to Singapore in 2003 to serve as the first executive director of the Institute of Bioengineering and Nanotechnology, a division of the Agency for Science, Technology and Research (A*STAR). Her research concerns the biomedical and catalytic applications of nanostructured systems and materials.

In 2005, Ying was the youngest member inducted into the German National Academy of Sciences Leopoldina.

In March 2018, Ying stepped down from her position as Executive Director at the Institute of Bioengineering and Nanotechnology to lead her own lab, NanoBio lab.

In 2021, Ying was elected as a member of the United States National Academy of Engineering.

Since then, Ying has been appointed Chief Innovation and Research Officer at King Fahd University of Petroleum & Minerals (KFUPM).

== Honours and awards ==
During 2008, Ying was chosen by the American Institute of Chemical Engineers as an Engineer of the Modern Era. Ying was elected to the Singapore Women's Hall of Fame in 2014.

In December 2015, it was announced that she was one of the recipients of the inaugural 2015 Mustafa Prize awarded by the Mustafa Science and Technology Foundation. She was awarded the "Top Scientific Achievement" award for "her great scientific and technological contributions and achievements to the synthesis of well-designed advanced nanostructured materials and systems, nanostructured biomaterials and miniaturised biosystems for various interesting applications". In 2016, she was elected to the Cooper Union Hall of Fame for her achievements.

When the National Academy of Inventors gave Ying a fellowship in 2017, she was the first Singapore-based scientist to receive this honour. The following year, Ying became a laureate of the Asian Scientist 100 by the Asian Scientist. In 2020, Ying received a Lifetime Achievement Award from the Journal of Drug Targeting for "her many outstanding contributions in the fields of nanotechnology and nanomedicine including drug delivery and targeting." In 2021, she was elected to the National Academy of Engineering. She has served as the Editor in Chief of Nano Today, and is currently advising the journal as Editor Emeritus. In 2023, she was awarded the King Faisal Prize. In 2024, she was granted Saudi Arabian citizenship by royal decree.

She is also a Young Global Leader of the World Economic Forum.

== Personal life ==
Ying is a practicing Muslim, having converted to the faith when she was 35, the year when her daughter was born.
