= Annual Review of Biomedical Engineering =

Academic journal

- Discipline: Biomedical engineering
- Language: English
- Edited by: Martin L. Yarmush and Mehmet Toner

Publication details
- History: 1999–present, 27 years old
- Publisher: Annual Reviews
- Frequency: Annually
- License: Subscribe to Open
- Impact factor: 11.5 (2025)

Standard abbreviations
- ISO 4: Annu. Rev. Biomed. Eng.

Indexing
- CODEN: ARBEF7
- ISSN: 1523-9829 (print); 1545-4274 (web)
- OCLC no.: 40878112

Links
- Journal homepage

Annual Review of Biomedical Engineering is an academic journal published by Annual Reviews (AR). In publication since 1999, this journal covers the significant developments in the broad field of biomedical engineering with an annual volume of review articles. It is edited by Martin L. Yarmush and Mehmet Toner. As of 2021, Annual Review of Biomedical Engineering is being published as open access, under the Subscribe to Open model. As of 2026, Journal Citation Reports gave the journal has an impact factor of 11.5 ranking it eleventh out of 130 journals in the category "Biomedical Engineering".

== History ==
The Annual Review of Biomedical Engineering was first published in 1999 by Annual Reviews (AR), a nonprofit organization whose stated mission is to synthesize knowledge "for the progress of science and the benefit of society." The inaugural editor was Martin L. Yarmush; Yarmush remained editor until 2021, at which point he was co-editor along with Mehmet Toner. Though it began with a physical edition, it is now only published electronically.

== Scope and indexing ==
The Annual Review of Biomedical Engineering defines its scope as covering significant developments relevant to biomedical engineering. Included subfields are biomechanics; biomaterials; computational genomics; proteomics; healthcare, biochemical, and tissue engineering; biomonitoring; and medical imaging. As of 2026, Journal Citation Reports lists the journal's impact factor as 11.5, ranking it eleventh of 130 journal titles in the category "Biomedical Engineering". It is abstracted and indexed in Scopus, Science Citation Index Expanded, MEDLINE, EMBASE, Inspec and Academic Search, among others.

== Editorial processes ==
The Annual Review of Biomedical Engineering is helmed by the editor or the co-editors. The editor is assisted by the editorial committee, which includes associate editors, regular members, and occasionally guest editors. Guest members participate at the invitation of the editor, and serve terms of one year. All other members of the editorial committee are appointed by the AR board of directors and serve five-year terms. The editorial committee determines which topics should be included in each volume and solicits reviews from qualified authors. Unsolicited manuscripts are not accepted. Peer review of accepted manuscripts is undertaken by the editorial committee.

=== Current editorial board ===
As of 2022, the editorial committee consists of the co-editors and the following members:

- James S. Duncan
- Martha L. Gray
- Todd P. Coleman
- Frances Ligler
- Wendy M. Murray
- Yaakov Nahmias
- Eleftherios Terry Papoutsakis
- Erkin Şeker
- Marjolein C. H. van der Meulen
- Jennifer L. West
- George R. Wodicka

== See also ==
- List of engineering journals and magazines
