= Mohammad Khaja Nazeeruddin =

Swiss chemist and materials scientist

Professor Mohammad Khaja Nazeeruddin
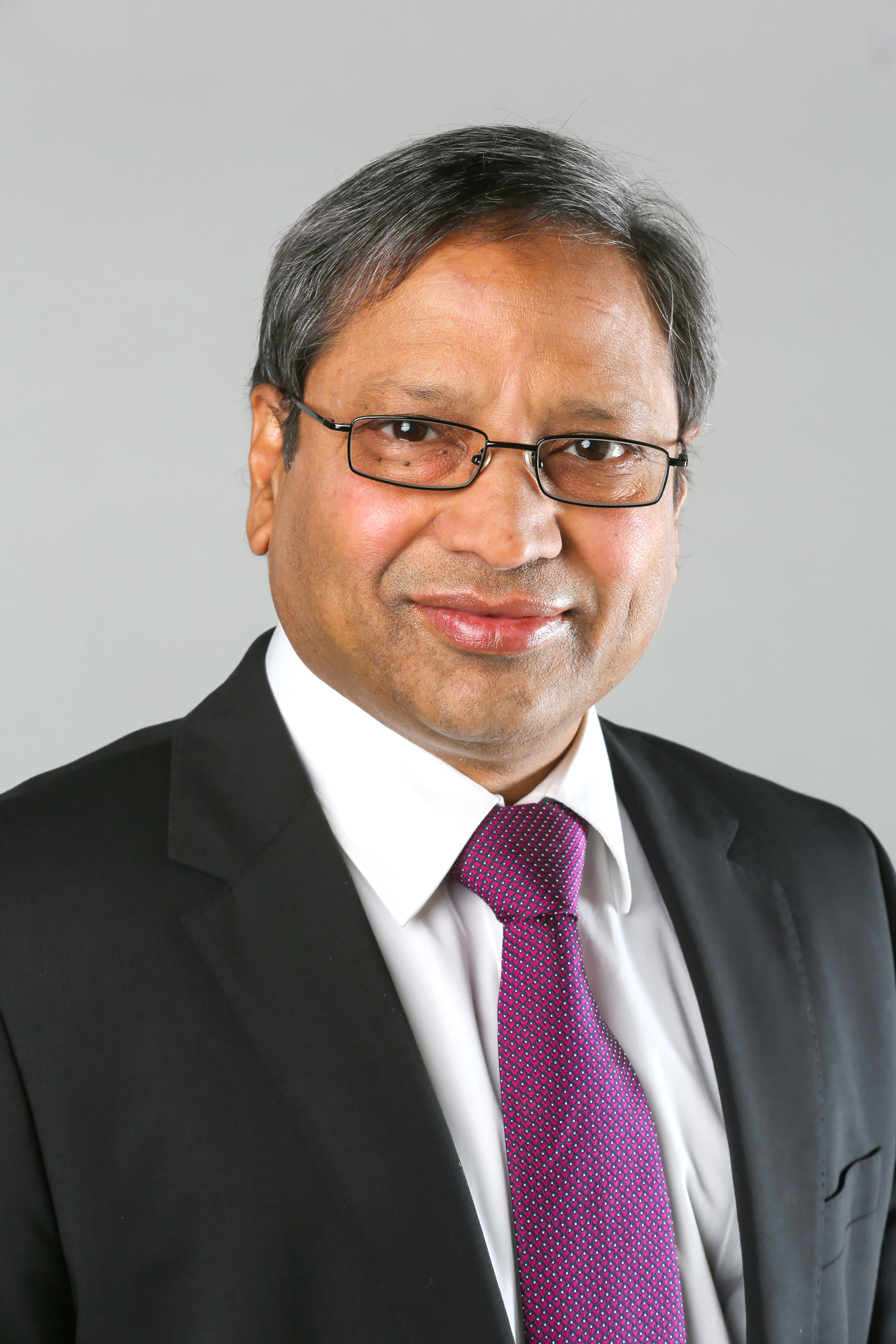
- Mohammad Khaja Nazeeruddin in 2020
- Born: 1957 (age 68–69); Thumboor, India
- Occupation: Full professor
- Known for: Perovskite solar cells Light-emitting diodes

Academic background
- Education: Chemistry
- Alma mater: Osmania University

Academic work
- Discipline: Chemistry
- Sub-discipline: Materials science
- Institutions: EPFL (École Polytechnique Fédérale de Lausanne)
- Main interests: Dye-sensitized solar cells Perovskite solar cells Light-emitting diodes Molecular engineering of functional materials
- Website: https://gmf.epfl.ch/

Mohammad Khaja Nazeeruddin (born 1957 in Thumboor, Andhra Pradesh, India) is an Indian-Swiss chemist and materials scientist who conducts research on Perovskite solar cells, dye-sensitized solar cells, and light-emitting diodes. He is a professor at EPFL (École Polytechnique Fédérale de Lausanne) and the director of the Laboratory for Molecular Engineering of Functional Materials at School of Basic Sciences.

== Career ==
Nazeeruddin received a PhD in chemistry from the Osmania University in Hyderabad, India. He served as a lecturer at Osmania University for two years. He then joined the Central Salt and Marine Chemicals Research Institute in Bhavnagar, India. In 1987 he joined EPFL, first as a postdoctoral fellow, and then held several positions as research fellow for seven years. In 2012, he was promoted to "Maître d' Enseignement et de Recherche" (senior lecturer). Since 2014 he has served as full professor at EPFL (École Polytechnique Fédérale de Lausanne) and head of the Laboratory for Molecular Engineering of Functional Materials at School of Basic Sciences based at EPFL's Valais campus.

2023 –2029 Professor and Director for the Institute of Perovskite Photovoltaics and Integrated Optoelectronics, IC, Southeast University, Wuxi, China.

2022 –2029 Emeritus Professor, Faculty of Basic Sciences, ISIC, EPFL, Switzerland.

2012 –2022 Professor, Faculty of Basic Sciences, ISIC, Group for Molecular Engineering of Functional Materials, EPFL, Switzerland.

2009–2014 World Class University Professor, Department of Advanced Materials Chemistry, Korea University (Sejong Campus), Korea.

2014-2019 Brain Korea Plus (BKPLUS 21), Department of Advanced Materials Chemistry, Korea University.

2014-2023 Visiting Professor, King Abdul-Aziz University, Jeddah, Saudi Arabia.

2024-2029 Professor, Imam Abdulrahman Bin Faisal University, Dammam, Saudi Arabia.

2023-2029 Research Fellow, INTI, International University, Malaysia.

2014-2021 Participated in the Program of Introducing Talents of Discipline to University ("111" Program) Supported by the Ministry of Education of China, North China Electric Power University.

2024-2026 Guest Professor in Haixi Institutes, Chinese Academy of Sciences.

2023-2029 Advisory Board member of the University of Sharjah- College of Sciences

2024-2026 International Iberian Nanotechnology Laboratory Scientific Advisory Board.

He has also had several affiliated while working and employed at EPFL, such as World Class University Professor (2009–2014) and BKPLUS 21 (2014–2019) at the Department of Advanced Materials, Chemistry of the Korea University, and visiting professor at King Abdulaziz University in Jeddah, Saudi Arabia (2014–2023) and at the North China Electric Power University (2014–2021), and an eminent professor at Brunei.

== Research ==
Nazeeruddin's research focuses on chemical engineering of functional materials for photovoltaic and light-emitting applications such as Perovskite and dye-sensitized solar cells, and light-emitting diodes.

His team conducts research in the area of inorganic chemistry of ruthenium sensitizers that convert solar energy through the use of high surface area nanocrystalline mesoscopic films of oxide semiconductors. These tailored-sensitizers have attracted additional research in dye-sensitized solar cell research. They have synthesized several ruthenium sensitizers (N3, N719 and N749), donor-π-bridge-acceptor porphyrin sensitizers, and near IR sensitizers. A further field of their research encompass organic light-emitting diodes (OLEDs) that are used in the fabrication of digital displays. They contributed novel blue, green, and red phosphorescent iridium emitters for OLEDs.

His laboratory is located at the EPFL-Sion Energy center, focusing on organic, inorganic lead halide perovskite solar cells and Light Emitting Diodes research. His laboratory has fabricated blue, green, and red PLEDs with unprecedentedly high external quantum efficiency. His group has investigated solutions (one-step and sequential deposition) and sublimation-deposited perovskite solar cells and obtained a power conversion efficiency of 25%. His group has developed a Perovskite Solar Cells Module (area 26.02 cm2) with an efficiency of 22.4%. Their research has been covered in several international news outlets. These cells and modules are not commercially deployed and much more research and development needs to be done and long-term stability of the cells and modules have yet to be demonstrated. There are numerous leading researchers world-wide working on this problem. Perovskite-based solar cell technology in general is still in the developmental stage and essentially no perovskite-based solar modules have been commercially deployed for harnessing solar power.

== Publications and awards ==
Nazeeruddin is a co-author on numerous peer-reviewed papers and book chapters, and is a co-inventor on many patents. According to Thomson Reuters he has been named a "Highly Cited Researcher" in chemistry, materials science and engineering in 2016 and 2017, and was included in the list of "World's Most Influential Scientific Minds" from all scientific domains. As stated in the ISI listing, he is one of the most cited chemists with more than 196,000 citations and an h-index of 190. His group has earned worldwide recognition and leadership in Perovskite solar cells. The Times Higher Education named him among "the top 10 researchers in the world working on the high impact perovskite materials and devices". Nazeeruddin was included as one of the Top 2% Most-Cited Scientists in the world on the list published by Stanford University in October 2022.

He is an elected member of the European Academy of Sciences, and a fellow of the Royal Society of Chemistry. Fellow of Telangana Academy of Sciences, and Member of the Swiss Chemical Society. He was awarded the 34th Khwarizmi International Award in Basic Sciences, 2021.

Since 2018 he has been a jury member of the Rei Jaume I foundation in Spain.

He is the recipient of the best paper award from the journal Inorganics, the EPFL Excellence Prize (1998 and 2006), the Mustafa Prize (2025) the Brazilian FAPESP fellowship award (1999), the Japanese Government Science & Technology Agency Fellowship (1998), and Government of India National Scholar award (1987-1989).

He is editor in chief of Chemistry of Inorganic Materials, an advisory board member at Advanced Functional Materials, an associated editor at Energy Chem, an editorial advisory board member at Scientific Reports, an editorial advisory board member at RRL Solar, and an editorial advisory board member at Artificial Photosynthesis.

== Selected works ==
(1). Cation interdiffusion control for 2D/3D heterostructure formation and stabilization in inorganic perovskite solar modules, Cheng Liu, Yi Yang, Jared Fletcher, Ao Liu, Isaiah W. Gilley, Charles Bruce Musgrave, Zaiwei Wang, Huihui Zhu, Hao Chen, Robert P. Reynolds, Bin Ding, Yong Ding, Xianfu Zhang, Raminta Skackauskaite, Haoyue Wan, Lewei Zeng, Abdulaziz S. R. Bati, Naoyuki Shibayama, Vytautas Getautis, Bin Chen,Kasparas Rakstys, Paul J. Dyson, Mercouri G. Kanatzidis, Edward H. Sargent & Mohammad K. Nazeeruddin, Nature Energy (2025), Volume 10, Issue 8,DOI10.1038/s41560-025-01817-6.

(2) Solubilizing and stabilizing C60 with n-type polymer enables efficient inverted perovskite solar cells, Zhou Xing, Suxiang Ma, Bin-Wen Chen, Mingwei An, Ajuan Fan, Xinqiong Hu, Yang Wang, Lin-Long Deng, Qiufeng Huang, Hiroyuki Kanda, Fahad Gallab Al-Amri, Gainluca Pozzi, Yi Zhang, Jianxing Xia, Jiazhen Wu, Xugang Guo, and Mohammad Khaja Nazeeruddin (2025), Joule 9, 101817. https://doi.org/10.1016/j.joule.2024.101817.

(3). Cation reactivity inhibits perovskite degradation in efficient and stable solar modules, Yong Ding, Bin Ding, Pengju Shi, Jan Romano-deGea, Yahui Li, Roland C. Turnell Ritson, Olga A. Syzgantseva, Ilhan Yavuz6, Ming Xia, Ruohan Yu, Maria A. Syzgantseva, Jean-Nicolas Audinot, Xiaohe Miao, Xiaobin Liao, Jiantao Li, Patrick Dörflinger, Vladimir Dyakonov, Cheng Liu, Yi Yang, Li Tao, Keith G. Brooks, Andre Slonopas, Jiahong Pan, Lei Zhang, Qinyou An, Yaoguang Rong, Jun Peng, Liming Ding, Enzheng Shi, Liqiang Mai, Songyuan Dai, Kangning Zhao, Jiang Sheng,Rui Wang, Paul J. Dyson, Mohammad Khaja Nazeeruddin, Scioence, (2024), 386, 531–538.

(4). Dopant-additive synergism enhances perovskite solar modules, Bin Ding, Yong Ding, Jun Peng, Jan Romano-deGea, Lindsey E. K. Frederiksen, Hiroyuki Kanda, Olga A. Syzgantseva, Maria A. Syzgantseva, Jean-Nicolas Audinot, Jerome Bour5, Song Zhang6, Tom Wirtz5, Zhaofu Fei, Patrick Dörflinger, Naoyuki Shibayama, Yunjuan Niu, Sixia Hu, Shunlin Zhang, Yan Liu, Guan-Jun Yang, Keith Brooks, Linhua Hu, Sachin Kinge, Vladimir Dyakonov, Xiaohong Zhang, Songyuan Dai, Paul J. Dyson and Mohammad Khaja Nazeeruddin, Nature (2024). https://doi.org/10.1038/s41586-024-07228-z).

(5). A thermotropic liquid crystal enables efficient and stable perovskite solar modules, Yang, Y ; Liu, C; Ding, Y; Ding, B; Xu, J; Liu, A; Yu, JQ; Grater, L; Zhu, HH; Hadke, SS; Sangwan, VK; Bati, ASR; Hu, XB; Li, JT; Park, SM; Hersam, MC; Chen, B; Nazeeruddin, MK; Kanatzidis, MG; Sargent, EH, NATURE ENERGY, (2024) Volume 9, Issue 3. DOI 10.1038/s41560-023-01444-z.

(6). Oriented nucleation in formamidinium perovskite for photovoltaics, Shi, PJ; Ding, Y; Ding, B; Xing, QY; Kodalle, T; Sutter-Fella, CM; Yavuz, I; Yao, CL; Fan, W; Xu, JZ; Tian, Y; Gu, DY; Zhao, K; Tan, S; Zhang, X; Yao, LB; Dyson, PJ; Yang, DR; Xue, JJ; Nazeeruddin, MK; Yang, Y; Wang, R. NATURE, (2023) 620, 7973, 323. DOI 10.1038/s41586-023-06208-z.

(7). Single-crystalline TiO2 Nanoparticles for Narrowing the Scalability Gap towards Stable and Efficient Perovskite Modules, Yong Ding, Bin Ding, Hiroyuki Kanda, Onovbaramwen Jennifer Usiobo, Thibaut Gallet, Zhenhai Yang, Yan Liu, Hao Huang, Jiang Sheng, Cheng Liu, Yi Yang, Valentin Ianis Emmanuel Queloz, Xianfu Zhang, Jean-Nicolas Audinot, Alex Redinger, Wei Dang, Edoardo Mosconic, Wen Luo, Filippo De Angelis, Mingkui Wang, Patrick Dörflinger, Melina Armer, Valentin Schmid, Rui Wang, Keith G Brooks, Jihuai Wu, Vladimir Dyakonov, Guanjun Yang, Songyuan Dai, Paul J Dyson, Mohammad Khaja Nazeeruddin, Nature Nanotechnology, (2022), 17, 598-605. DOI:10.1038/s41565-022-01108-1

(8). Tuning structural isomers of phenylenediammonium to afford efficient and stable perovskite solar cells and modules, Liu, C, et al., NATURE COMMUNICATIONS, (2021), 12, 6394.

(9). Dimensional Tailoring of Hybrid Perovskites for Photovoltaics, Giulia. G and Nazeeruddin, MK, NATURE Reviews Materials, (2019) volume 4, 4–22.

(10). Guanidinium/Methylammonium Lead Iodide Perovskite: An Unexplored Avenue for Stable and 20% Efficient Solar Cells, Jodlowski, AD, Roldán-Carmona, C, Grancini, G, Salado, M, Ralaiarisoa, M, Ahmad, S, Koch, N, Camacho, L, de Miguel, G, and Nazeeruddin, MK, Nature Energy, (2017), 2, 972. https://doi.org/10.1038/s41560-017-0054-3
