= Seer, Inc. =

American biotechnology company

Seer
- Type: Public
- Traded as: NASDAQ: SEER
- Industry: Biotechnology
- Founded: 2017
- Headquarters: Redwood City, California
- Key people: Omid Farokhzad (co-founder, CEO), Robert Langer (co-founder, chair of scientific advisory board)
- Revenue: $16.6 million (2025)
- Net income: ▲ −US$73.6 million (2025)
- Number of employees: 140 approx. (2024)
- Website: seer.bio

Seer, Inc. (NASDAQ: SEER) is an American biotechnology company headquartered in Redwood City, California. Established in 2017, the company develops technologies for proteomics research.

== History ==
Seer was founded in 2017 by Omid Farokhzad, Philip Ma, and Robert Langer, based on nanoparticle technologies developed in Farokhzad’s laboratory at Brigham and Women’s Hospital, Harvard Medical School. Early investors included Maverick Capital, aMoon Fund, Wing VC, T. Rowe Price, and Fidelity.

In September 2020, Seer spun off PrognomiQ to focus on clinical applications, such as developing a liquid biopsy blood test for early lung cancer detection. Philip Ma became President and CEO of PrognomiQ. Farokhzad serves as chair of the board of directors of PrognomiQ. Seer retains approximately 19% ownership in the company.

On December 4, 2020, Seer completed its initial public offering, raising approximately $336.2 million in proceeds. Underwriters included J.P. Morgan, Morgan Stanley, Bank of America Securities, and Cowen.

Seer launched the Proteograph Product Suite in January 2021, which included the SP100 automation instrument and the Proteograph RISE assay kit. In June 2023, the company introduced the Proteograph XT assay kit, which increased system throughput by 150%.

In May 2025, Seer released a high-throughput version of the Proteograph Product Suite, including the Proteograph ONE Assay and SP200 Automation Instrument. The system supports processing of up to 1,000 samples per week and is designed for large-scale proteomic studies.

== Business model and operations ==
Seer receives revenue from the sale of products to government, academic, biopharma, and contract research organization (CRO) customers, and by providing proteomics services through its Seer Technology Access Center (STAC) in Redwood City and Bonn, Germany.

Seer has approximately 140 employees, including sales and customer support staff in the USA, Europe, and Asia. The company’s headquarters, including its research and development, is located in Redwood City, California, with additional offices in San Diego, California, and a services laboratory in Bonn, Germany. The company generated $14.2 million of revenue in 2024.

== Technology and product offerings ==
Seer's proteomics platform integrates engineered nanoparticles, automated sample preparation, and mass spectrometry. It utilizes nanoparticles with different physicochemical properties, including size, charge, and hydrophobicity, to separate and enrich proteins from biological samples, thereby addressing common issues related to dynamic range and sample complexity in proteomics. Seer's platform enables deep, unbiased proteomic analysis, allowing researchers to identify proteins associated with disease or therapeutic response without relying on prior assumptions.

A 2020 study published in Nature Communications demonstrated that these nanoparticles form distinct protein coronas, enabling high-depth, parallel profiling of the plasma proteome. Independent benchmark studies indicate that nanoparticle-based plasma proteomics workflows significantly enhance proteome depth and improve quantitative precision when compared to traditional neat-plasma methods. These studies report approximately 3 to 6 times more protein identifications and about twice the reproducibility in independent side-by-side experiments.

As of 2025, 58 papers have been published related to the Proteograph, including in journals such as Nature, Nature Communications, Nature Aging, and Cell Metabolism. Among these, a 2025 Nature Aging study reported the identification of more than 10,000 proteins, underscoring the Proteograph platform’s depth in studies at scale.

The Proteograph Product Suite includes the Proteograph ONE Assay: a reagent system that provides for multiplexed nanoparticles for protein enrichment, the SP200 Automation Instrument: a fluid handling robotic system for preparing a large number of biological samples for mass spectrometry analysis, and the Proteograph Analysis Suite (PAS): a cloud-based software solution for large-scale proteomics data analysis.

== Partnerships ==
The company entered into a co-marketing and sales agreement with Thermo Fisher Scientific in November 2024 to promote the integration of Seer’s Proteograph system with Thermo Fisher’s Orbitrap mass spectrometers.

In June 2025, Seer announced a collaboration with Korea University and major Korean cancer centers, including Seoul National University Hospital and Samsung Medical Center. The partnership will support a large-scale plasma proteomics study aimed at identifying blood-based biomarkers for cancers in young adults. The study will utilize Seer’s Proteograph platform and a mass spectrometer from Thermo Fisher Scientific to analyze over 20,000 plasma samples.
