= Protos =

Protos means "first," derived from the ancient Greek πρῶτος.

Protos may also refer to:

- Protos (monastic office), a monastic office at the Eastern Orthodox monastic state of Mount Athos
- Protos (constructor), a former racing car constructor
- Protos of Nonnendamm, a defunct German motor vehicle manufacturer
- PROTOS (train), a German train
- Protos (album), the 2014 eleventh album by Norwegian electronic dance music producer Aleksander "Savant" Vinter
- PROTOS, a project by OUSPG
- Protos, a marketing name for Strontium ranelate
- Protos, one of the winemakers in the Ribera del Duero region
- Protos, a name given to the bishop of Rome in the declaration of Ravenna
- Protos, a model helicopter developed by MSH
- Ioannis Protos, a Greek athlete
- Protos o Hlios, a song by Mikis Theodorakis
- Protos – PROgram for TOp Simulations, Monte Carlo generator for Top quarks and new heavy particles

== See also ==
- Proto-
- Protoss
