= Delayed gadolinium-enhanced magnetic resonance imaging of cartilage =

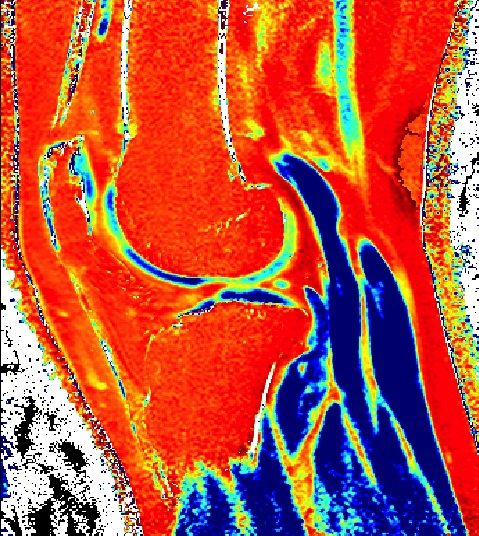
- dGEMRIC T1 Map of knee cartilage
- Purpose: measures relative proteoglycan content of articular cartilage

Delayed gadolinium-enhanced magnetic resonance imaging of cartilage or dGEMRIC measures the fixed-charge density and relative proteoglycan content of articular cartilage using the spin-lattice relaxation time or T1 relaxation time. Current research is investigating the clinical application of dGEMRIC as a quantitative tool for monitoring cartilage function in diseased or repair cartilage.
