= Martin Yarmush =

American biomedical engineer (born 1952)

- Born: October 8, 1952 (age 74); Brooklyn, New York, U.S.
- Education: Yeshiva University (BA); Rockefeller University (PhD); Yale University (MD); Massachusetts Institute of Technology (PhD); Harvard University (MA)
- Scientific career
- Fields: Biomedical engineering, biochemical engineering, immunology, biophysical chemistry
- Workplaces: Massachusetts Institute of Technology; Harvard University; Rutgers University
- Doctoral advisors: Thomas Kindt; Richard Krause; Clark Colton

Martin (Maish) L. Yarmush (born October 8, 1952 in Brooklyn, New York) is an academic, American scientist, physician, and engineer known for his work in biotechnology and bioengineering. His faculty career began in 1984 at MIT in the Department of Chemical Engineering as a Principal Research Associate (Associate Research Professor) and Lucille P. Markey Scholar in Biomedical Science . In 1988 he joined Rutgers University, as Professor of Chemical and Biochemical Engineering and a member of the Center of Advanced Biotechnology and Medicine. In 1995, he returned to the Boston area to serve as the Helen Andrus Benedict Professor of Surgery and Bioengineering in the Harvard-MIT Division of Health Sciences and Technology, and to establish the Center for Engineering in Medicine at the Harvard Affiliated Teaching Hospitals. In 2007 he returned to Rutgers to hold the Paul and Mary Monroe Endowed Chair in Science and Engineering and serve as Distinguished Professor in the Department of Biomedical Engineering. He also holds a Lecturer in Surgery and Bioengineering position at Harvard Medical School, and is a member of the Senior Scientific Staff at the Shriners children's hospital in Boston.

Yarmush is the founding editor of the Annual Review of Biomedical Engineering which was first published in 1999 by the nonprofit publisher Annual Reviews. He is a series editor for the book series Frontiers In Nanobiomedical Research. In 2015 Yarmush was elected as a member of the National Academy of Inventors, and in 2017, Yarmush was elected as a member of the National Academy of Engineering "for pioneering advances in cellular, tissue, and organ engineering and for leadership in applying metabolic engineering to human health."

== Education ==
Yarmush attended the Hebrew Institute of Boro Park (Yeshivat Etz Chaim), Yeshiva University of High School of Brooklyn (BTA), Yeshiva University, The Rockefeller University, Yale University School of Medicine, and the Massachusetts Institute of Technology (MIT).

== Career ==
Yarmush has worked as a professor at MIT, Harvard, and Rutgers and has held adjunct positions at the University of Pennsylvania School of Veterinary Medicine. He is known for his scholarly contributions to many areas of biotechnology and bioengineering; and for the many students and fellows that he has trained who have gone on to significant academic and industrial careers. He also serves as the founding director of the National Institutes of Health (NIH) - Rutgers Predoctoral Biotechnology Training Program which has received continuous financial support from the NIH for 34 years. Yarmush is also the founding director of the Center for Engineering in Medicine & Surgery (CEMS) based at the Massachusetts General Hospital. The center was established in 1995 with faculty based at several Harvard Medical School-Affiliated Teaching Hospitals (Massachusetts General Hospital, Brigham and Women's Hospital, and Beth Israel Hospital) in coordination with MIT, Harvard University, and Boston's Shriners Hospitals for Children, and with support from the Whitaker Foundation. At the time, Yarmush was the Helen Andrus Benedict Professor of Surgery and Bioengineering in the Harvard-MIT Division of Health Sciences and Technology (HST) and at Harvard Medical School.

Yarmush currently holds the Paul and Mary Endowed Chair in Science and Engineering at Rutgers University and also serves as a Distinguished Professor in the Department of Biomedical Engineering. He also holds a Bioengineer position at the Massachusetts General Hospital, a Lecturer in Surgery and Bioengineering position at Harvard Medical School, and a Senior Scientific Staff position at the Shriners Children's, Boston.

== Research ==
Yarmush has published over 580 peer-reviewed articles with ~ 50,000 citations and an H-index of 112 (Google Scholar). Yarmush has filed patent applications for more than 60 inventions in medical and technical fields and is a member of the National Academy of Inventors. He has worked on wound healing, metabolic engineering, dynamic microfabricated cell and tissue systems, biomedical devices, cell therapies, tissue engineering and regenerative medicine, including the development of non-invasive treatments to prevent scarring after burns. Yarmush has led a team that has developed storage protocols that can increase the amount of time that a donor organ can be stored and still be viable for use in human transplant operations.

Yarmush has led development of a robot for drawing blood samples which can be analyzed with a point-of-care downstream processing and analysis system. This device could decrease the most frequent type of clinical injuries for both patients and hospital staff, and provide immediate results to doctors. The venipuncture robot has been recently tested in a human clinical trial.

== Awards ==
- 2022, The Sackler Scholar, Sackler Institute of Advanced Studies, Tel Aviv University, Israel
- 2020, Daniel Gorenstein Memorial Award, Rutgers U
- 2018, Lady Davis Visiting Faculty Fellow and Institute Lecturer, Hebrew University, Jerusalem, Israel
- 2017, Fellow, US National Academy of Engineering
- 2015, Robert A. Pritzker Distinguished Lecture Award from the Board of Directors of the Biomedical Engineering Society (BMES)
- 2015, Fellow, US National Academy of Inventors
- 2013, Top 20 Translational Researchers, Nature Biotechnology
- 2011, Food, Pharmaceutical and Bioengineering Division Award, American Institute of Chemical Engineers (AIChE)
- 2009, Distinguished University Visiting Professor, Michigan State University
- 2009, Keynote Speaker, ASME Summer Bioengineering Conference
- 2006, NIH Career Enhancement Award for Stem Cell Research
- 2006, Fellow, New Jersey High Tech Hall of Fame
- 2005, AIChE 15d/e Plenary Lecture
- 2004, Award for Programmatic Excellence in Undergraduate Education, Rutgers University
- 2001, AIChE 15c Plenary Lecture
- 1997, Bernard Revel Memorial Award in Arts & Sciences, Yeshiva University
- 1993, Founding Fellow, American Institute of Medical and Biological Engineering
- 1992, Board of Trustees Award for Excellence in Research, Rutgers University
- 1989, NIH Research Career Development Award (1989-94)
- 1988, NSF Presidential Young Investigator Award (1988-93)
- 1985, Lucille P. Markey Scholar Award in Biomedical Science (1985-1992)
