= Proto (band) =

- Origin: Memphis, Tennessee
- Genre: Progressive rock
- Years active: 2002–present
- Labels: Torrent Records LLC, TuneCore/Proto
- Members: Eric Matthew Berkes; Shaun Shelton West; James Mark Crider; Krista Lynn Wroten; Benjamin Christian Cowell Mansfield; Jack Benjamen Kirton

Proto is a six-member progressive rock band, originally from Memphis, which moved to Chattanooga (Tennessee) in January 2003. After recording their first EP release with new label Torrent Records LLC., Shaun West and J. Mark Crider began Proto with Erik Berkes in 2002.

== Background ==
In the fall of 2003, the band began preparing for their first release to prelude the full-length album. Proto asked violinist Krista Wroten (schooled in classical music training at Boston University) if she was interested in playing on the CD to fill out some of the songs. What began only as an addition to the record became an addition to the band.

They quickly recruited lead guitarist Benjamin Mansfield and wrote their first song, "The Backwards Waltz". The song embodied a mutual frustration within the band towards ignorance and the destruction of the human mind. It was from this collaboration that the band realized their potential and agreed to pursue a serious career in music. The music immediately took precedence over everything else in their lives.

Proto continued to write new material for their first full-length album, which was due out in 2004. After recording, the band left Memphis for Chattanooga.

Other projects of members of Proto are All Things Green and North American Royalty. The latter is formed by ultra-melodic, female vocal-fueled Elise Berkes on lead vocals and guitar; Krista Wroten of Proto on violin and vocals; Jack Kirton of Proto on guitar, mandolin and steel guitar; and Dennis Hubbard and Joey Berkley from All Things Green on bass and percussion.

Their first song, "Monkey", off the self-titled album, was used in the introduction of the movie Devour (2005) starring Jensen Ackles, and in the third season of Roswell.

== Members ==
- Erik Matthew Berkes – vocals, guitar (1983–present)
- Shaun Shelton West – drums, percussion (1982–present)
- James Mark Crider – bass guitar (1979–present)
- Krista Lynn Wroten – violin (1983–present)
- Benjamin Mansfield Christian Cowell – lead guitar (?-present)
- Jack Benjamin Kirton – guitar, mandolin, steel guitar (1980–present)

== Discography ==
Proto have two full-length albums. Their first release, Proto, was released and distributed in digital and physical format copy in a special limited production, unlike the second album, The Alchemist, which was only released in digital form, via TuneCore, iTunes Store, Amazon, eMusic, and Rhapsody.

Other songs not included in albums: "When Shall I Return"

Length: 00:30 | Year: 2010 | Genre: Film score, Electronic, New Age. | Moods: Dark, Suspenseful
Catalog/Publisher: Absurd Music (Ascap) / Bny Music (Ascap) / Evan Edward Publishing (Ascap).

=== Proto (2003) ===
No.	Title	Length
1.	"Monkey"	04:14
2.	"The Obvious"	01:44
3.	"The Backwards Waltz"	04:36
4.	"Essence Of..."	00:58
5.	"Breathe This Day"	06:46
6.	"Clarity In..."	00:24
7.	"Breathing"	12:34
Total length:		31:20

Additional and technical information

Release: June 1, 2003 (EP), September 23, 2003 (Album)
Recording Type: Studio (Stereo)
Label: Torrent Records, LLC (3649 W Road, Signal Mountain, Tennessee, 37377-3001)
Universal Product Code: 7158647 (Torrent Records JMS1-2)
Copyright Claimant: Threptos Music, LLC d.b.a. Baby New Year Music, Evan Edward Publishing
Lyrics "Monkey": West, Berkes
Lyrics "The Backwards Waltz": Crider, Berkes
Lyrics "Breathe This Day": Berkes
Music and Production: Proto
Engineered, Recorded and Mixed: Willie Peaver (Chief Engineer)
Studio Crew: Brandon Sams (Engineering Assistant), Chuck Goin (Studio Assistant), Chris McCrudden (Instrument Tech)
Recorded in the U.S.A. at Young Avenue Sound Studio in Memphis, TN
Edited and Mastered by Roger Lian at Masterdisk Studios in New York, NY
Graphic Design: Eric Jackson
Art Concept: Proto
Thanks to PM Music and The Drum Shop. Proto thanks families, friends and all those who have pointed us in the right direction.
Artist Representation: Torrent Records, LLC (www.torrentrecords.com)
Barcode: 783707706627

Music featured on:

- WB Television Network series Roswell: Second Season DVD (2003)
- Devour (2005)

=== The Alchemist (2007) ===
No.	Title	Length
1.	"Adaptation"	01:58
2.	"Chameleon"	03:36
3.	"Lemmings"	03:27
4.	"Asunder"	03:22
5.	"Sigma Six"	00:47
6.	"Threshold"	03:45
7.	"Perception"	01:04
8.	"Cannibal"	03:30
9.	"Apogee"	2:44
Total length:		24:17

Additional information
Release: April 9, 2007
Recording Type: Studio (Stereo)

Label: TuneCore/Proto
