= Proto (magazine) =

- Summer 2010 cover
- Categories: Science magazine
- Frequency: print: 3x/year
- Founded: 2005
- Company: Massachusetts General Hospital
- Country: United States
- Based in: Boston, Massachusetts
- Language: English
- Website: protomag.com

Proto is a national science magazine and website produced by Massachusetts General Hospital in collaboration with Time Inc. The magazine was launched in 2005 and covers news in the field of biomedicine and health care, focusing on basic and clinical research, policy and technology. Recently featured topics include synesthesia, chronic pain policy and aging physicians. The magazine also includes interviews with major figures in the medical world and personal essays about patients’ experiences with health care. Articles from the magazine have been reprinted and cited in a number of well-known venues, including The Washington Post. Proto targets physicians, researchers, policymakers, health care leaders and others with an interest in science and health care.
