= Photonics Spectra =

Monthly B2B magazine

- Senior Editor: Jake Saltzman
- Categories: Science and technology magazines
- Frequency: Monthly
- Total circulation (2019): 100,000
- First issue: January 1967 (Optical Spectra and renamed to Photonics Spectra in 1982)
- Company: Laurin Publishing Company, Inc.
- Country: United States
- Based in: Pittsfield, MA
- Language: English
- Website: www.photonics.com
- ISSN: 0731-1230

Photonics Spectra is a monthly business-to-business (B2B) magazine published for the engineers, scientists, and end users who develop, commercialize and buy photonic products. It provides both technical and applications information for all aspects of the global industry, integrating all segments of photonics: optics, lasers, imaging, fiber optics and electro-optics as well as photonic component manufacturing, solar cell improvements, LED lighting for cars and offices, THz, EHz, UV, IR, and visible light imaging and test equipment.

In addition to news and feature articles, Photonics Spectra contains business reports, technology updates, reader forums, new products and literature, calendars of conferences and courses, and applications reports.

Photonics Spectra has been published since 1967 by Laurin Publishing Company, Inc. in Pittsfield, MA, United States.

== History ==
The first Optical Industry Directory was published in 1954 by Dr. Clifton Tuttle, an eminent retired Eastman Kodak physicist. At its inception the Directory was a small single volume. It succeeded notably, expanding over the years into the present multimedia publication.

Theresa "Teddi" C. Laurin (1924 - November 5, 2015) joined the company in 1962 and, as publisher, worked closely with Dr. Tuttle. In 1964 Francis T. Laurin and Teddi C. Laurin purchased and incorporated the company, which later became known as Laurin Publishing Company. In 1967, in response to industry demands, she founded and launched Optical Spectra. In 1982 the magazine's name was changed to Photonics Spectra to reflect the growing influence of these new light-based technologies. Today, the worldwide distribution of Photonics Spectra is over 100,000 copies.

Laurin Publishing currently maintains a staff of over 50 employees at its headquarters in Pittsfield, Mass. and at its editorial and sales branch offices. The company also includes several contributing editors located around the world and an editorial advisory board of over 25 leaders in the photonics industry.

== Prism Awards ==
The Prism Awards for Photonics Innovation is an international competition that honors the best new photonic products on the market. The Prism Awards has received applications from more than 35 countries across the globe. Applications are judged by a panel of leading industry experts, venture capitalists, luminaries, and visionaries.

Since 2008 SPIE and Photonics Media have been working together on the award, named the "Photonics Oscar" by OptecNet Deutschland, to bring attention and give recognition to companies that are creating products that make a difference.
