= 50th Independence Anniversary Papua New Guinea =

Papua New Guinea celebration 50th Independence Anniversary

50th Independence Anniversary
- Official name: PNG50th independence Anniversary
- Also called: PNG50
- Observed by: People of Papua New Guinea
- Liturgical color: Red, Yellow, Block
- Type: Independence celebration
- Celebrations: National
- Begins: August
- Ends: 27 September
- Date: 16 September 2025
- Frequency: Annual
- First time: 1975

Papua New Guinea's 50th independence anniversary was celebrated on 16 September 2025. The celebration, from 14 to 19 September, was attended by regional partners and international dignitaries. The Independence Hill on the streets of Port Moresby, aimed to showcase the unity of "One Country, One Future" while highlighting the country's growing role in the Pacific and the world.

== Independence ==
James Marape, Prime Minister of Papua New Guinea delivers remarks during the Papua New Guinea’s 50th Anniversary Independence celebration in Port Moresby,

Papua New Guinea adopted a constitution mandating a democratic government on 15 September 1975. On 16 September, the nation gained independence from Australia under the leadership of Sir Michael Somare, the First Prime Minister of the country. He is the unifying figure among many tribes' groups more than 800 languages. Papua New Guinea held its inaugural national elections in 1977. After Independence on 10 October 1975, Papua New Guinea joined the United Nations.

== Leaders ==
Adm. Samuel J. Paparo, commander of U.S. Indo-Pacific Command, presented Ambassador Ann Marie Yastishock with a PNG Disaster Management Reference Handbook, developed by U.S. Indo-Pacific Command’s Center for Excellence in Disaster Management in collaboration with PNG and international partners on 15 September 2025.

Leaders from several countries attended the Golden Jubilee, including Prince Edward, Duke of Edinburgh, receiving a formal state welcome as representative of King Charles III. The US Deputy Secretary of State Christopher Launda also arrived in a VIP aircraft early that morning and was greeted by US Ambassador Ann Marie Yastischock and another delegation. India's Minister of State for External Affairs and Textiles, Pabitra Margherita, from New Delhi also attended. China's Minister of Ecology and Environment Huang Runqiu representing Chinese President Xi Jinping. From Japan the Japan International Cooperation Agency, delegate was Hayakawa Yuko, Director General for the Southeast Asia and Pacific Department. Indonesian President Prabowo Subianto joined at 8 a.m., then Australian Prime Minister Anthony Albanese joined at midday for the celebrations.

== Logo ==
Prime Minister James Marape launched the 50th independence anniversary logo in national parliament house at Port Moresby.

== Events ==
USINDOPACOM Commander celebrates PNG’s 50th Independence Day

The Employer's Federation of Papua New Guinea announced circular to the organizations which sets the planned national wide by the Government's PNG50 independence celebrations in August and September 2025. Other activities and events included:

- August 14, Mount Hagen cultural show at Queen Park - WHP
- August 23 and 24, PNG50 Jubilee Rest Gospel Concert at the Sir John Guise Stadium, - National Capital District.
- September 2, 3, Ship Open Day at the Old Wharf Champions Parade- National Capital District.
- September 4, Navel cocktail Reception at the APEC Haus in Port Moresby.
- people perform a Kinavai Dawn Dance during a celebration for Papua New Guinea's 50th Independence Day on 16 September 2025
  September 5th and 6th, Military Tattoo- PNGDF week at the Sir Hubert Murray Stadium, Port Moresby.
- September 6 Saturday, Air Show in Ela Beach, Port Moresby, the same day Army cocktail Reception at the Yacht Club.
- Aircraft static Display—PNGDF week at ATW HQ- National Capital District
- Opening of the new National Court House on10th September, Wednesday at the Waigani Courthouse Port Moresby.
- September 13 Unity Walk in the National Capital District.
- APOM Music, arts and Cultural shows at Ela Beach, Ugagi, Murray Barracks (Port Moresby), Port Moresby.
- On September 14, the Prime Minister's Multilateral Cocktail function in the National capital district.
- PM's Dinner at the APEC Haus - Port Moresby.
- September 16, Flag Raising at Independence Hill in NCD, The same day PN50 Spectaculars Main events at the Sir Hubert Murray Stadium, National capital district.
- September 27 The Golden Toana Night at the Hilton Hotel Port Moresby.

== See also ==
- 50th Independence Anniversary King's Medal
- Independence Hill Port Moresby
- Port Moresby

== Gallery ==
Papua New Guinea Defense Force members conduct close order drill during a celebration for Papua New Guinea's 50th Independence Day on Sept. 16, 2025.

Members of the Tolai people arrive to shore as they perform a Kinavai Dawn Dance celebrating Papua New Guinea's 50th Independence Day on 16 September 2025.
