= Independence Hill Port Moresby =

Papua New Guinea memorial

Coordinates: 9°25′35″S 147°11′27″E

- 1975
- Capital: Port Moresby, Papua new Guinea
- Recognised national languages: Top Pisin, moto
- Religion: Christian
- Demonym: Papua new Guinean
- History
  - Established: 1975
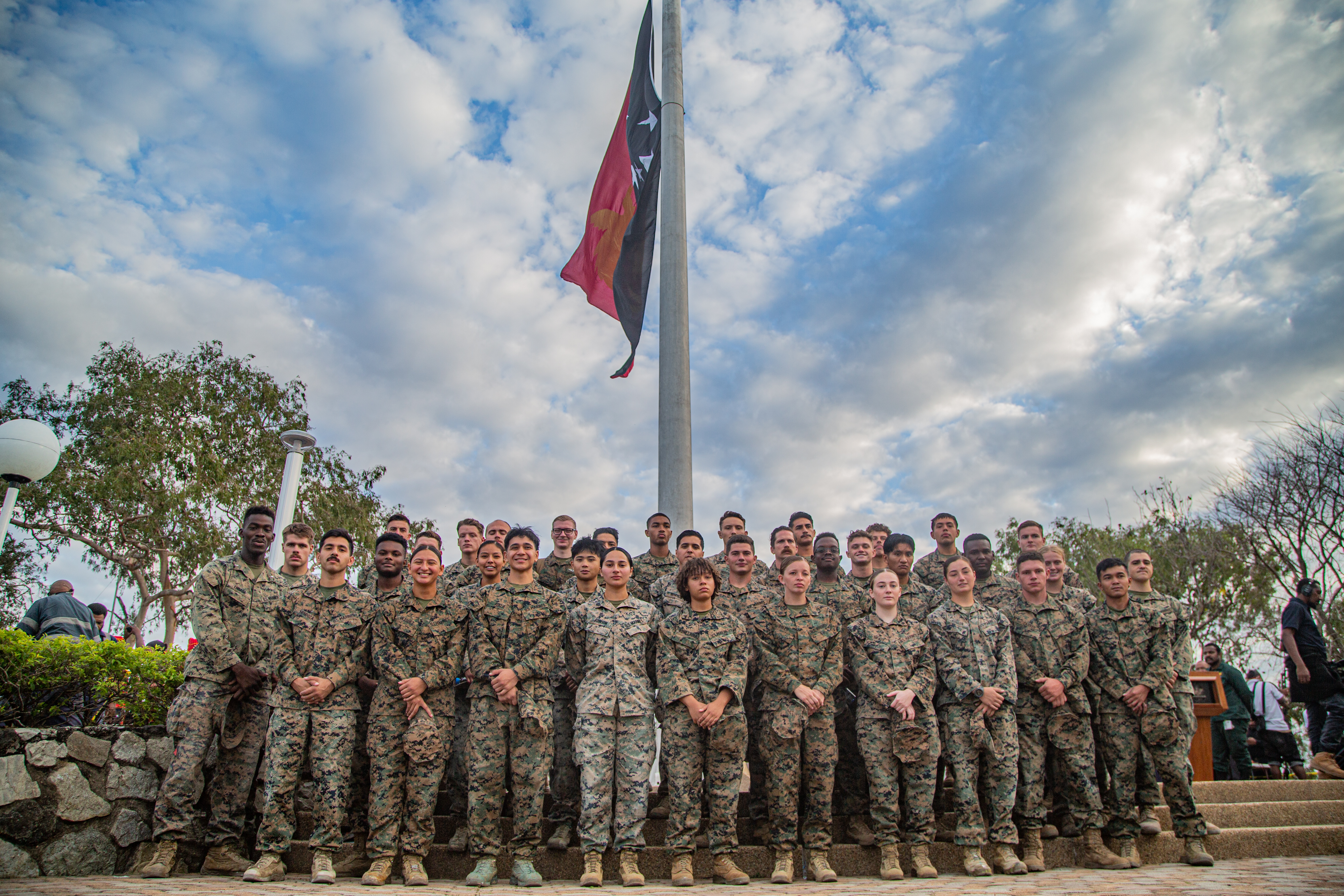
- U.S. Marines and Sailors with Task Force Koa Moana 23 attend the 48th Independence Day Ceremony on Independence Hill, Port Moresby, Papua New Guinea, Sept. 16, 2023

Independence Hill is located in Port Moresby, Papua New Guinea. It contains many historical records. It tells the story of the Papua New Guinean independence movement and is a monument with many meanings. That place is a place that celebrates freedom and liberation. It is a historic site where the national flag was first hoisted. It has become a symbol of the country's independence and is a place of pride and contemplation. Here, citizens, leaders and international guests gather to commemorate the country's golden jubilee journey to independence. The flag hoisting ceremony at Independence Hill is a reminder of the country's rich history, unity, and bright future.

== History ==
Australia's colonial rule ended 70 years ago. Their flag was hoisted at Sir Hubert Murray Stadium in Papua New Guinea's capital, Port Moresby. The flag was hoisted on Independence Hill, next to the newly built parliament building. Australia has a complicated history with its close neighbors. In 1960, Prime Minister Edmund Burton accepted control of what was then a British colony. The Australian government first accepted the southern part. The northern part had been under German occupation. During World War I, Australian forces expelled the Germans, and the former German New Guinea was also claimed as Australian territory. When the Japanese invaded Papua New Guinea in 1942, Australian and Papua New Guinean soldiers joined forces to block their advance. By the 1970s, control of Papua New Guinea had yielded little benefit to Australia, and many Papua New Guineans longed for independence. In 1972, Australian Prime Minister Gough Whitlam and Papua New Guinean President Michael Somare began working together towards decolonization. Three years later, it became a reality. Papua New Guinea and Australia have maintained close ties despite their separation. With the most backward health and education systems in the Pacific region, Papua New Guinea continues to rely heavily on Australian aid. Papua New Guinea has been well-governed since 1975. Every year, the national flag-raising ceremony at Independence Hill is held with great fanfare, with many members of the public also celebrating.

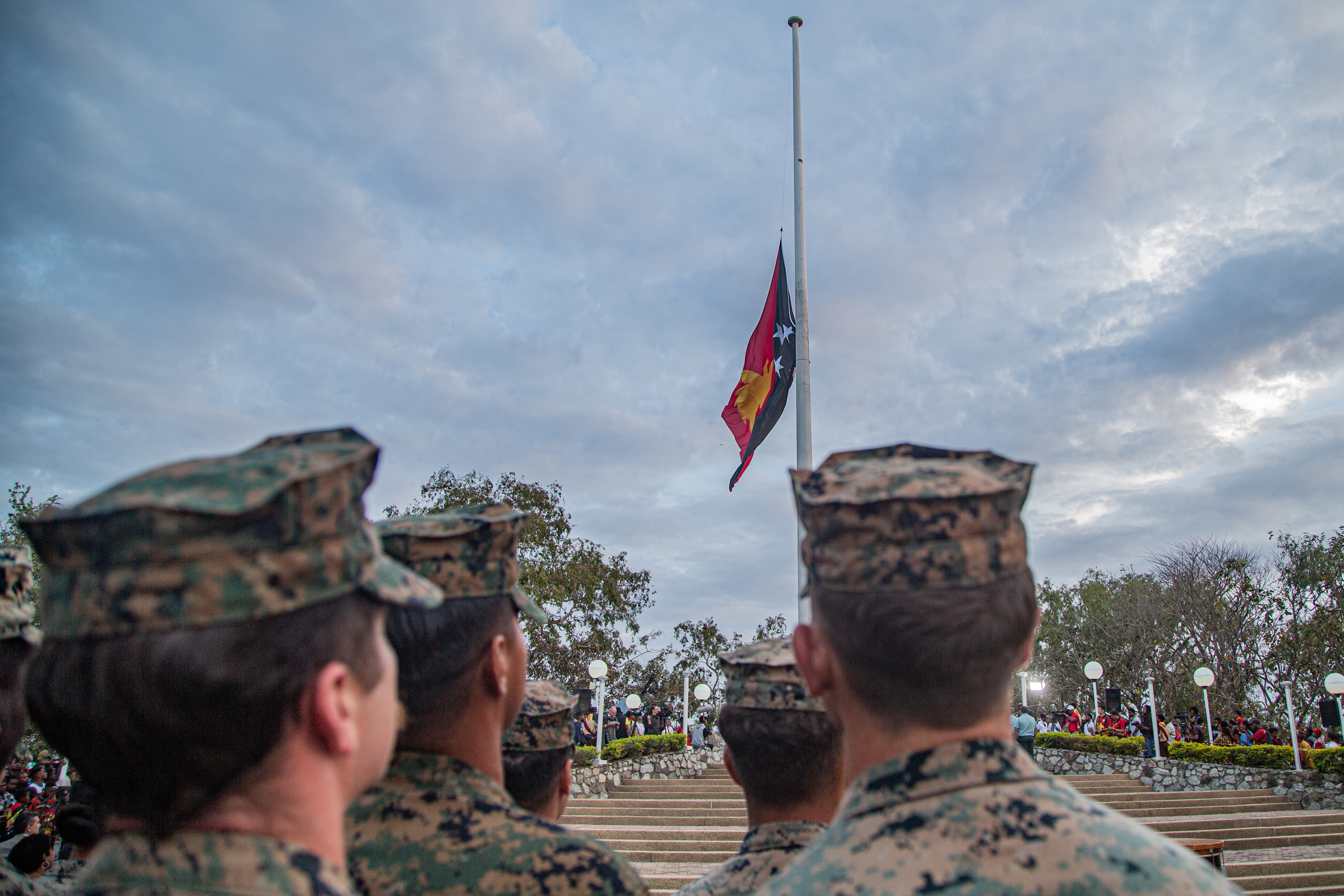
KM23- Koa Moana Marines Attend PNG Independence Day Celebrations

== Bougainville ==
The autonomous Bougainville region is seen as a push for independence. The map of Papua New Guinea could be redrawn. Port Moresby is seen as a domino effect that threatens further fragmentation. Port Moresby’s fate depends on how long it takes to reconcile its fractured identity – colonial relic, wartime fortress, and struggling megacity – with a unified future.

== See also ==
- History of Papua New Guinea
- Papuan languages
- 50th Independence Anniversary King's Medal
- 50th Independence Anniversary Papua New Guinea
