= Annual =

Annual may refer to:

- Annual publication, periodical publications appearing regularly once per year
  - Yearbook
  - Literary annual
- Annual plant
- Annual report
- Annual giving
- Annual, Morocco, a settlement in northeastern Morocco
- Annuals (band), a musical group

== See also ==
- Annual Review (disambiguation)
- Circannual cycle, in biology
