= Gingeras =

Gingeras is a surname. Notable people with the surname include:

- Alison M. Gingeras (born 1973), American curator and writer
- Ryan Gingeras (born 1978), American historian
- Thomas Gingeras (fl. 1976), American geneticist
