= Annual Review of Genomics and Human Genetics =

- Discipline: Genomics; Human genetics
- Language: English
- Edited by: Aravinda Chakravarti; Susan A. Slaugenhaupt

Publication details
- History: 2000–present, 26 years old
- Publisher: Annual Reviews (US)
- Frequency: Annually
- Open access: Subscribe to Open
- Impact factor: 8.3 (2025)

Standard abbreviations
- ISO 4: Annu. Rev. Genom. Hum. Genet.
- NLM: Annu Rev Genomics Hum Genet

Indexing
- CODEN: ARGHC4
- ISSN: 1527-8204 (print); 1545-293X (web)
- OCLC no.: 874372288

Links
- Journal homepage

The Annual Review of Genomics and Human Genetics is a peer-reviewed scientific journal published by Annual Reviews (AR) since 2000. It releases an annual volume of review articles relevant to the fields of genomics and human genetics. Aravinda Chakravarti and Susan A. Slaugenhaupt are the journal's co-editors. As of 2021, Annual Review of Genomics and Human Genetics was published as open access, under the Subscribe to Open model. As of 2026, Journal Citation Reports lists the journal's impact factor as 8.3, ranking it fourteenth of 192 journal titles in the category "Genetics & Heredity".

== History ==
The Annual Review of Genomics and Human Genetics was first published in 2000 by Annual Reviews (AR), a nonprofit organization whose stated mission is to synthesize knowledge "for the progress of science and the benefit of society." AR decided that its existing journals, the Annual Review of Medicine and the Annual Review of Genetics, were shifting their coverage from biochemical genetics to molecular interpretation; the new journal could focus on the intersection of genetics and medicine. Another impetus for forming the journal was the then-ongoing Human Genome Project to map the human genome. The founding editor was Eric Lander, who stayed in the role through 2004. Though it was initially in publication with a print volume, it is now only published electronically.

== Scope and indexing ==
The Annual Review of Genomics and Human Genetics defines its scope as covering significant developments in the field of genomics that are relevant to human genetics and the human genome. Included subfields are human genetic disorders, individualized medicine, human genetic variation, the structure and function of genomes, genetic engineering, and human evolution. It is abstracted and indexed in Scopus, Science Citation Index Expanded, MEDLINE, EMBASE, Chemical Abstracts Core, and Academic Search, among others.

== Editorial processes ==
The Annual Review of Genomics and Human Genetics is helmed by the editor or the co-editors. The editor is assisted by the editorial committee, which includes associate editors, regular members, and occasionally guest editors. Guest members participate at the invitation of the editor, and serve terms of one year. All other members of the editorial committee are appointed by the AR board of directors and serve five-year terms. The editorial committee determines which topics should be included in each volume and solicits reviews from qualified authors. Unsolicited manuscripts are not accepted. Peer review of accepted manuscripts is undertaken by the editorial committee.

=== List of editors ===
- Eric Lander (2000–2004)
- Aravinda Chakravarti and Eric D. Green (2005–2026)
- Chakravarti and Susan A. Slaugenhaupt (2026–present)

=== Current editorial board ===
As of 2026, the editorial committee consists of the co-editors and the following members:

- Valérie Cormier-Daire
- Ross C. Hardison
- Julie Makani
- Andrew S. McCallion
- Karen H. Miga
- Pilar N. Ossorio
- Bing Ren

As of 2022, the editorial board was composed by:

- Wendy A. Bickmore
- Robert Cook-Deegan
- Nancy J. Cox
- Thomas Gingeras
- Pui-Yan Kwok
- Julie Makani
- Arnold Munnich
- Mai Har Sham
- Sarah A. Teichmann
