= Individualized medicine =

Type of medical treatment

Individualized medicine tailors treatment to a single patient. The term refers to an individual, truly personalized medicine that strives to treat each patient on the basis of his own individual biology.

Individualized medicine represents a further individualization of personalized medicine. While the latter is aimed at a specific group of patients, individualized medicine deals with the individual circumstances of a single person. Thus, individualized medicine goes one step further and can be considered as an increase in personalized medicine.

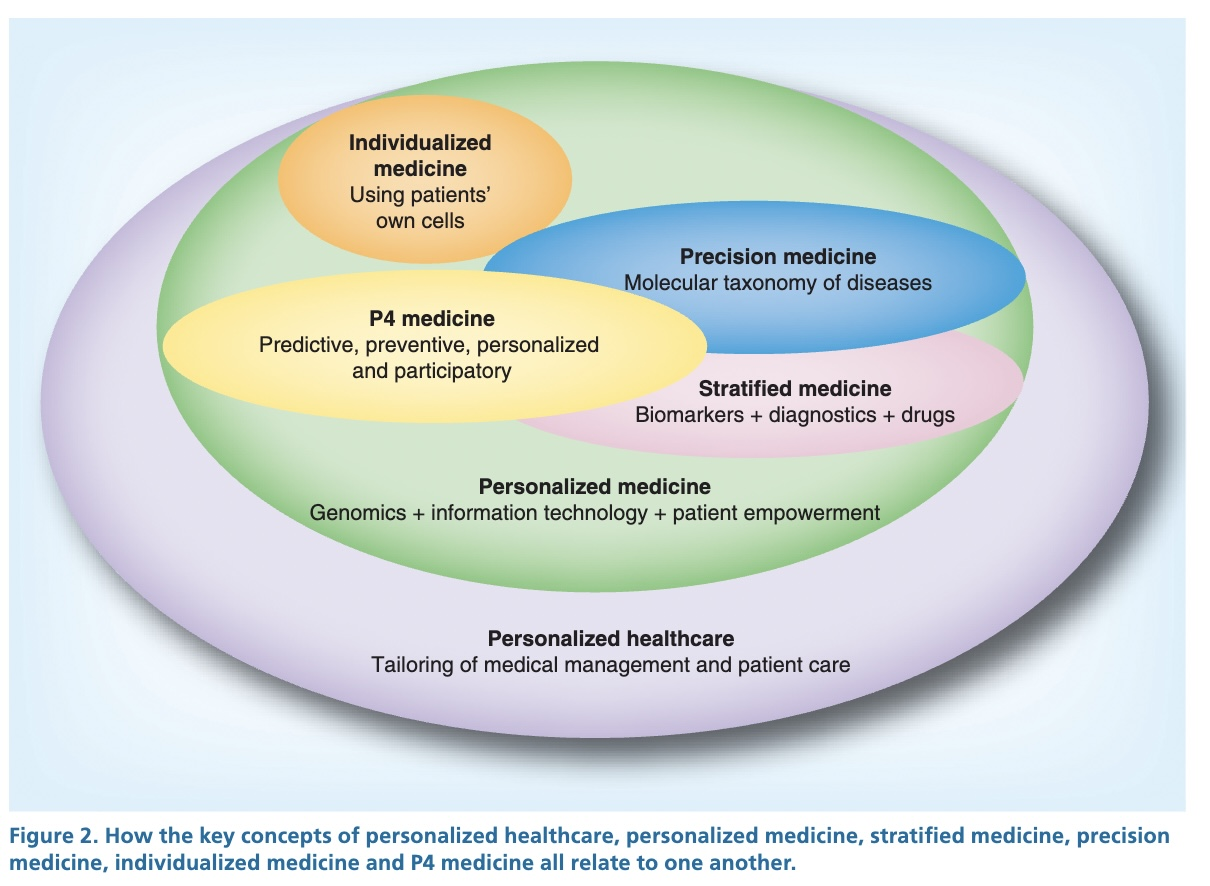
How the key concepts of personalized healthcare, personalized medicine, stratified medicine, precision medicine, individualized medicine and P4 medicine all relate to one another.

Individualized medicine seeks to derive tailored therapies for individuals by taking into account a person's genes as well as the full range of that person's unique nature, including biological, physiological and anatomical information.

== Background ==
Individualized medicine was first mentioned in the literature in 2003 and described the individual drug metabolism in pharmacogenomics. Subsequently, the term was used to improve diagnosis based on genetic differences and physiological information and to better tailor the treatment to the needs of a single patient.

More recently, a second context has been introduced that relates to therapeutic approaches that use a person's own cell material to develop a treatment that is unique to the patient from whom the material originated. Examples are stem-cell therapies and cancer vaccines, which are based on individually distinct molecular profiles.

== Access ==
Paternalistic, legal and FDA-imposed cost barriers are significant. Barriers to individualized medicine for life-threatening diseases can be avoided by treatments allowed by Individualized Treatments Acts.

== Genome research ==
Genome research has led to new resources that allow more accurate diagnosis and disease management to be tailored to each patient. The challenge of health research is to maximize therapeutic efficacy for each patient while minimizing side effects. An individual medicine approach may be required for those patients who cannot be categorized by mainstream personalized medicine or who suffer diseases without effective drug therapies. The widespread use of advanced imaging techniques and high-throughput technologies that allow for the in-depth study of genes, proteins, and metabolites provides a better understanding of the molecular processes involved in the origin and progression of a disease. Along with other information, these data form the basis for the development of new diagnostic technologies and treatment approaches that are customized for each individual patient.

== Individualized medicine in oncology ==
Individualized medicine is playing an increasingly important role, especially in oncology, given that cancers can be extremely heterogeneous between individual patients and within the tumor itself. For example, individualized cancer immunotherapy with the production of vaccines tailored to match a person's individual constellation of cancer mutations, the mutanome, has become a new field of research. Each patient has an individual mutational signature, and only a very small portion of the mutations are shared between patients. The aim of individualized medicine is to optimize the treatment strategy for a single patient using genetic information as well as molecular and cellular analyzes.
