= Autogene cevumeran =

Individualised mRNA cancer vaccine

Autogene cevumeran is an investigational mRNA vaccine being developed jointly by BioNTech and Genentech as an adjuvant therapy in cancer treatment to prevent cancer recurrence following surgery.

Autogene cevumeran is a type of individualised neoantigen-specific immunotherapy containing multiple different mRNA species that together encode up to 20 neoantigens that have been identified in the resected tumour of the patient. The aim of the vaccine is to stimulate the immune system to mount an adaptive response to any remaining cancer cells with these mutations.

== Research ==
=== Pancreatic ductal adenocarcinoma ===
==== Phase I ====
Autogene cevumeran has completed a phase I trial in resectable pancreatic ductal adenocarcinoma (PDAC), a type of pancreatic cancer, which has provided preliminary evidence of good efficacy and safety. The primary endpoint of the study was safety, while the secondary endpoints were 18-month overall survival (OS) and 18-month recurrence-free survival (RFS).

The study enrolled 34 patients, 28 of which underwent surgery to resect the PDAC. 19 of the patients who had undergone surgery then received atezolizumab, an immune checkpoint inhibitor. 16 of the patients on atezolizumab then received autogene cevumeran. 1 patient was considered to have insufficiently many neoantigens to manufacture the vaccine.

The patients who had received autogene cevumeran were classified as "responders" if IFNγ^{+} T cells against at least one of the neoantigens were detected by ELISpot (8 out of 16 patients in this study), and as "non-responders" otherwise (the remaining 8 patients). At the end of the study, the responders hadn't reached the 18-month RFS endpoint, meaning that their cancer hadn't recurred in the 18 months following treatment, while the non-responders had a median RFS of 13.4 months. The authors concluded that, given the preliminary evidence of efficacy and safety, an international phase 2 trial was imminent.
