= Neoepitope =

Neoepitopes are a class of major histocompatibility complex (MHC) bound peptides. They represent the antigenic determinants of neoantigens. Neoepitopes are recognized by the immune system as targets for T cells and can elicit immune response to cancer.

== Description ==
Epitopes, also referred to as antigenic determinants, are parts of an antigen that are recognized by the immune system. A neoepitope is an epitope the immune system has not encountered before. Therefore it is not subject to tolerance mechanisms of the immune system. As the mutant gene product is only expressed in tumors and is not found in non-cancerous cells, neoepitopes may evoke a vigorous T cell response. Tumor Mutational Burden (TMB, the number of mutations within a targeted genetic region in the cancerous cell's DNA) correlates with the number of neoepitopes, and have been suggested to correlate with patient survival post immunotherapy, although the findings about the neoantigen/immunogenicity association are disputed.

Neoepitopes arise from post-translational modifications. The mRNA translates information from the DNA into polypeptide composed of 20 standard amino acids and then proteins. Several of the standard amino acids can be posttranslationally modified by enzymatic processes, or can be altered through spontaneous (nonenzymatic) biochemical reactions.

There is increasing evidence that immune recognition of neoepitopes produced by cancer-specific mutations is a key mechanism for the induction of immune-mediated tumor rejection. Opportunities for therapeutic targeting of cancer specific neoepitopes are under investigation.

== As target for immunotherapy ==
Cancer is a patient-specific disease, and no two tumors are alike. Thus, the immunogenicity of each tumor is unique. A novel strategy against cancer is epitope selection for mutanome-directed individualized cancer immunotherapy.

Individualized cancer immunotherapy leverages the adaptive immune system by targeting T cells to tumor cells that have a tumor specific mutant antigen (neoantigen) with neoepitopes recognized by a receptor on T cells. One challenge is to identify the neoepitopes that trigger a suitable immune response, that is, to find out which neoepitopes in the individual tumor are highly immunogenic.

== Cancer vaccines ==
Individualized cancer immunotherapy includes vaccination with tumor mutation-derived neoepitopes. The concept is based on a mapping of the tumor-specific individual mutanome with identification of a range of suitable neoepitopes for a patient-specific vaccine. It is expected that the neoepitopes in the vaccine will trigger T cell responses to the specific cancer. For the concept of individualized cancer vaccination first data are available.
