= Annual publication =

Yearly printed works

Annual publications, more often simply called annuals, are periodical publications appearing regularly once per year. Although exact definitions may vary, types of annuals include: calendars and almanacs, directories, yearbooks, annual reports, proceedings and transactions and literary annuals. A weekly or monthly publication may produce an Annual featuring similar materials to the regular publication. Some encyclopedias have published annual supplements that essentially summarize the news of the past year, similar to some newspaper yearbooks.

To libraries and collectors, annuals present challenges of size (tens or hundreds of volumes) and completeness (acquiring a sequence with no missing volumes). They are handled similar to serial publications, which typically means a single library catalog record for the title, not for individual years. The single record must then indicate which volumes (years) are held.

The mid- and late 20th century saw a sharp increase in the publication of annuals to report scientific results and provide overview, both in ever more specialized topics and in popular summary.

== History ==
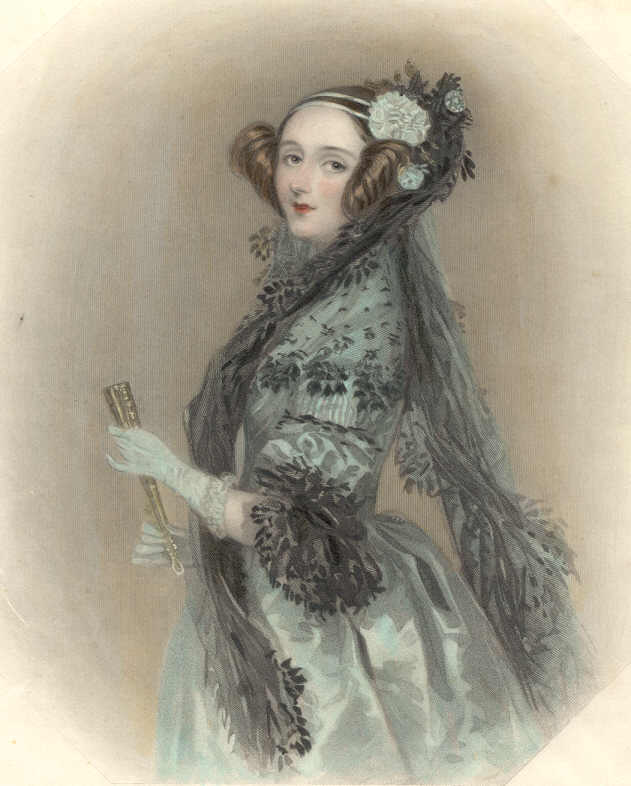
A hand watercolored etching etched by William Henry Mote of Ada Lovelace

A new form of literary work called the "Annual" was a fad from about 1823 through 1857 and became so popular that they were soon published up to 17 times a year. British royalty increased their popularity. They closely resemble many college literary "books" just produced for college campus today, except they contained many etchings of beautiful women from steel plates. They were the fashion magazines of the day. Later it became fashionable to watercolor the etchings and the "Annuals" became early coloring books. There was later a backlash against "beauty" and the fad ended, as did steel plate etchings for books.

"The Annual" was a long-running fad from 1824 until 1857 which started in England, but spilled over into the U.S. Steel plates of the 1820s allowed book publishers to mass-produce pictures. What started out as an "annual book" or a gift for the holidays turned into something that had up to 17 editions through the year (yet were still called annuals). Countess Blessington and other royal women contributed to the works and altered fashion. This fad was sometimes referred to as "beauty", as books with plates of women defined the content.

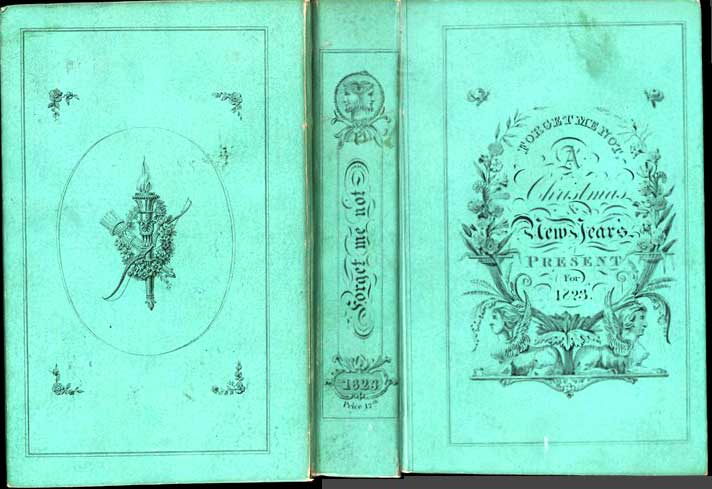
An early annual from 1822/3

In one book, the steel plate was damaged and another picture of a woman was simply used as a replacement. The illustrations often had nothing to do with the text content. The content of the text was often of poor quality and "The American Book of Beauty" contained a story of prison torture with an illustration of a pretty woman with a lapdog. "The American Book of Beauty" also has several copies of the books with portraits in different orders. One edition of the "Heath's Book of Beauty" was a college project and contained poems, short stories, etc. 1826 was not a good year for the annuals, because of the Panic of 1825. Thomas Hood's sarcastic poem "The Battle of the Annuals" was published in the 1830s. Watercolor became popular in the 1830s and the black and white etchings were the coloring books of the day. In 1842, Volume 1, page 521 of the Illustrated London News, there are sarcastic pictures poking fun at the annuals. In 1844 there was an article referring to it as imbecilic mania and finally the "Obituary for the Annual" appeared in the Art Journal of 1857. The death of the annuals and new photo techniques replacing etching ended most engravers' careers.

== Yearbooks ==
A yearbook is a volume that summarizes events of the past year. One of the earliest is The Annual Register, published in London since 1758. A forerunner is Abel Boyer's The Political State of Great Britain (38 volumes, 1711–29). Later examples include The Statesman's Yearbook (since 1864) and the Daily Mail Year Book (since 1901). Two early German titles are Europäischer Geschichtskalender, founded in 1861 by Heinrich Schulthess and Gottlob Egelhaaf's Historisch-politische Jahresübersicht (28 volumes, 1908–1936).

== Comic books ==
In the case of comic books, an annual is an extra issue that corresponds with an ongoing series, providing story material in addition to the customary 12 issues per year of a monthly series and filling holes in a publishing schedule that are usually created when a fifth release day falls in a month. A comic book annual customarily has a larger page count than its monthly counterpart, leaving room for longer single stories, biographical information on featured characters, full-page pin-ups of characters, reprints of previously published material, and/or all-new short stories (often called "back-up" stories). Chase Magnett, for ComicBook.com, highlighted that "annuals are ultimately best defined by being what the monthly issues are not" and that "the only consistency surrounding the concept of these special sorts of issues is that they have been around in some form or another just about as long as superhero comics have been published". An annual is considered a separate series for purposes of numbering and collectability; a particular periodical's Annual will thus have its own numbering series, or alternately be referred to by the year of its publication. As a result, annuals are much less valuable as collectables than other comic books, since collectors do not view them as part of a complete series run.

Comic book annuals originally were little more than reprint albums (for example Superman Annual #1, August 1960), representing stories that had first seen publication in their monthly counterparts, but eventually, this changed to annuals featuring primarily all-new material (the first example being Fantastic Four Annual #1, July 1963). Later annuals often featured stories with greater import to the characters featured than in the monthly publications, reflecting the "special" status of their once-yearly publication. Most annuals consisted of standalone stories that did not fit in with the then-current thrust of the monthly series' storyline.

In the late 1980s and much of the 1990s, annuals published by Marvel Comics and DC Comics were usually released in the summer of the year and often had a unifying theme, either a similar theme that individual stories were written around, or a crossover storyline bringing many of the characters in the individual publishers' continuities together for a single overall event. In the case of the "crossover" annuals, the number of characters and annuals involved in a crossover story varied. Some were company-wide, incorporating virtually every character in the publisher's shared universe whose series received an annual edition. Most of those which used smaller groups of characters were specific to teams or "extended families" of characters; annual crossovers with no preexisting connection between the characters do exist, such as Marvel Comics' "Lifeform" from 1990, but are comparatively rare.

Annuals published by DC and particularly Marvel became fewer and far between by the late 1990s, mainly due to the near-collapse of the comic book industry in the wake of the speculator boom; annuals were seen as an unnecessary risk in a climate where many monthly publications were in danger of cancellation for lack of sales (especially at Marvel, which filed for bankruptcy at this time). When the industry began to recover from the "bust", annuals began re-appearing on occasion, but by no means as regularly as before the "bust", when numbered series of annuals had reached the tens or twenties, indicating over a decade of regular publication.

Currently, the comic book annual is still something of a rarity, its purpose in presenting "extra" material often served by Special Editions that are released at random intervals rather than the set yearly schedule of an annual. Annuals often allow new talent to develop a story for A-list characters which "creates an opportunity for a rising star to encounter the dedicated fanbase associated with these series, developing overlap that can expand the audience for talented new voices and grow the publisher's concept of who should be part of their top tier of creators". In 2017, Katie Schenkel, for Book Riot, highlighted that annuals are "less common that they were 20 or 30 years ago, but when companies decide to put them out for specific series the annuals are often out towards the end of summer. Comic story arcs tend to be around six issues long, and annuals fit in between one arc and the next".

=== United Kingdom ===
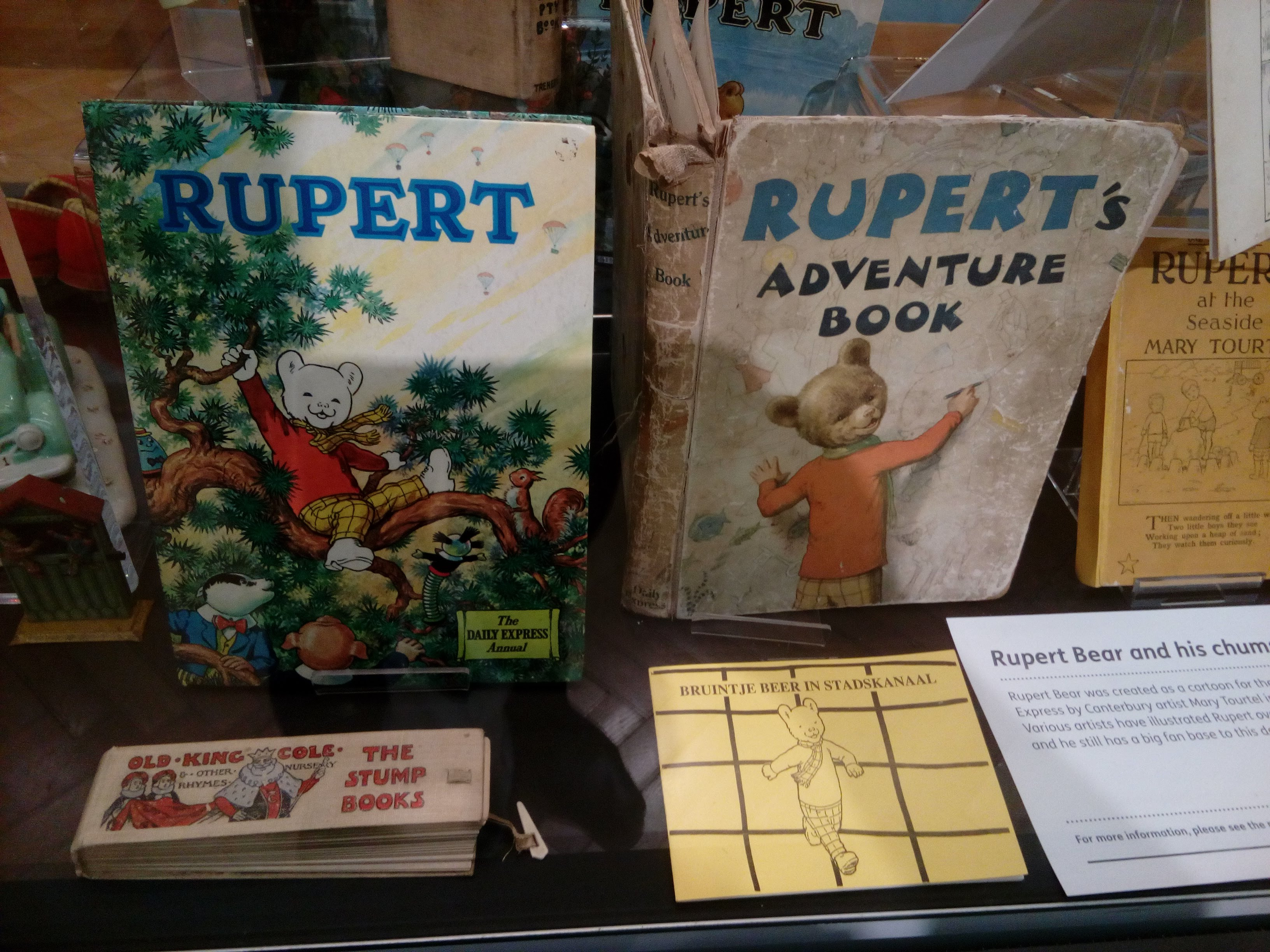
Rupert Bear Annuals

In the U.K., a large number of annuals are published shortly before the end of each year by companies such as D. C. Thomson, Egmont (formerly IPC/Fleetway), and Rebellion Developments, aimed at the Christmas market. These annuals are generally large-sized hardcover books with over 100 pages and a high color content. They are normally cover-dated with the following year's date to ensure that stockists do not remove them from their shelves immediately after the new year.

One of the earliest annuals was issued in 1822. Frederic Shoberl was the founding editor of Ackermann's The Forget-me-not, which was an early annual, a then-new type of publication in England. Shoberl continued to edit the annual until 1834. A junior version called The Juvenile Forget-me-not was published from 1828 onward.

For many years until the near-collapse of the British children's comics market, an annual would be published each year for each of the comic titles published by Thomson and IPC/Fleetway, featuring extra adventures of the comic's current and former characters, plus additional material in the form of puzzles, text articles, etc. Annuals were often even published for comics which had themselves ceased publication or been absorbed into other titles; for example, Scorcher annuals were still being published 10 years after the comic itself had been absorbed into Tiger. Today, this section of the market has been reduced to just a couple of surviving titles.

In addition, annuals are often published centered on sports, toys, currently-popular celebrities, recently released films, and popular TV series. In the period of the 1950s to the 1980s, companies like World Distributors, Brown Watson, and Grandreams were known for publishing annuals based on licensed characters and properties. British annuals are also published featuring American characters such as Spider-Man, often with simplified content aimed at younger readers. As tastes in these areas change, so does the line-up of annuals released each year. The increasing emphasis in recent years on annuals of this type (as opposed to the "classic" line-up of annuals based on comics) means that sales remain strong, and, in fact, they doubled between 1998 and 2005. Some annuals have become extremely collectible, especially The Beano, The Dandy, Rupert and Eagle.

== See also ==
- Annual Cyclopaedia
- Annual Reviews (publisher), and other publications titled Annual Review…
- D. Appleton & Company
