= Aravinda Chakravarti =

American geneticist

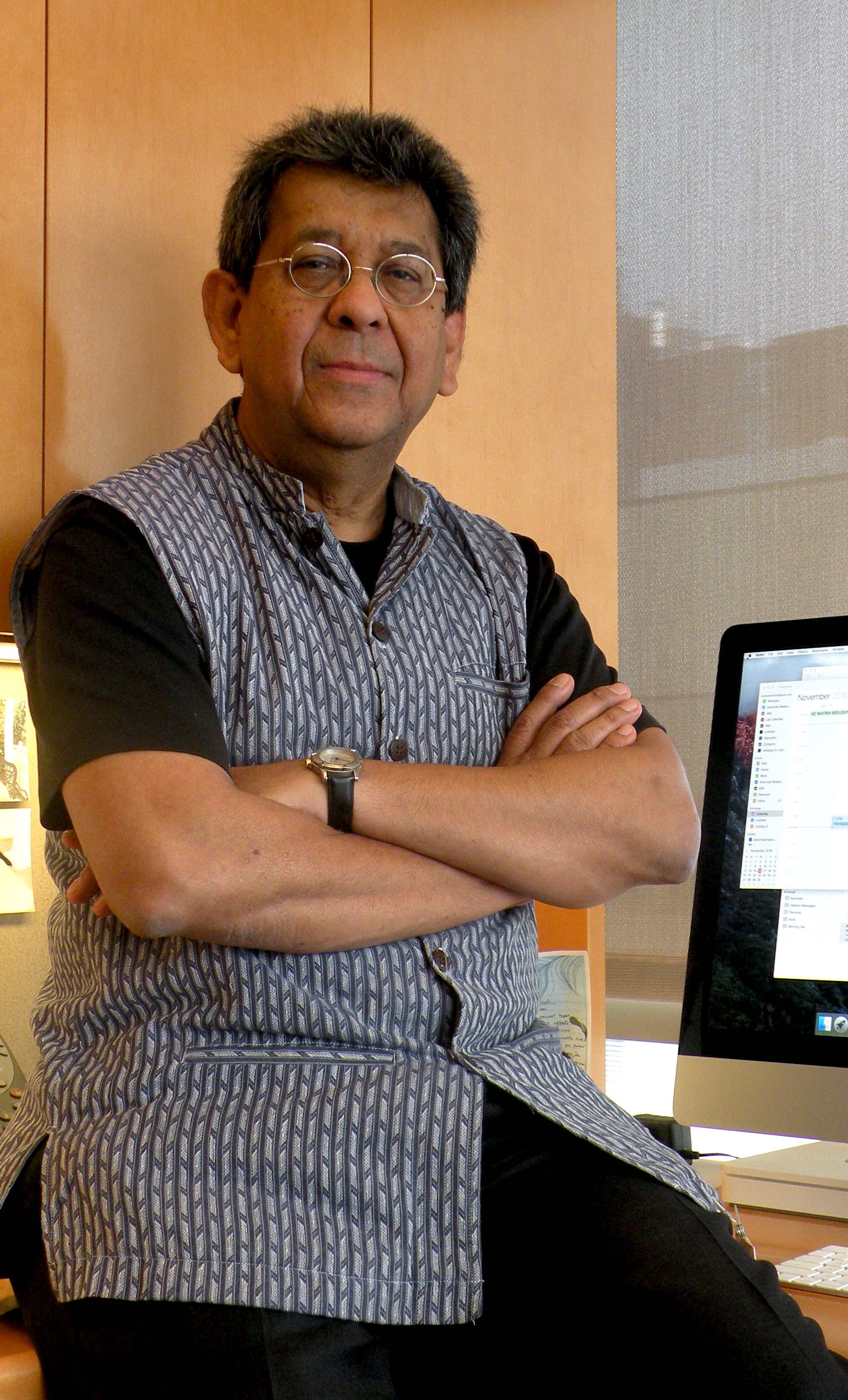
- Aravinda Chakravarti in 2018
- Born: 6 February 1954 (age 72); Calcutta, India
- Education: Indian Statistical Institute, University of Texas Health Science Center at Houston
- Awards: William Allan Award (2013)
- Scientific career
- Fields: Genetics
- Institutions: New York University, Johns Hopkins University School of Medicine, Case Western Reserve University, University of Pittsburgh
- Thesis: The Utility of Linked Marker Genes in Genetic Counseling (1979)
- Doctoral advisor: Masatoshi Nei
- Website: aravindachakravartilab.org

Aravinda Chakravarti (born 6 February 1954, Calcutta) is a human geneticist and expert in computational biology, and Director of the Center For Human Genetics & Genomics at New York University. He was the 2008 President of the American Society of Human Genetics. Chakravarti became a co-Editor-in-Chief of the journal Genome Research in 1995, and of the Annual Review of Genomics and Human Genetics' in 2005.

== Early life and education ==
Aravinda Chakravarti was born in Calcutta in 1954, his family's third son. Their childhood revolved around the importance of education, and he attended the Calcutta Boys' School (CBS).

Chakravarti received his Bachelor of Statistics in 1974 from the Indian Statistical Institute in Calcutta. He moved to the United States, where he studied with Masatoshi Nei, receiving his PhD in human genetics from the University of Texas Health Science Center at Houston in 1979. Chakravarti took a postdoctoral position at the University of Washington in Seattle until 1980.

Chakravarti has a wife, Dr. Shukti Chakravarti, and two daughters, Priya and Indira. His wife works at NYU as a professor, his daughter Priya is a special educator for Baltimore County Public Schools, and his daughter Indira works in public health at U. Penn.

== Career ==
Chakravarti was a member of the Department of Human Genetics at the University of Pittsburgh from 1980 – 1993. In 1994 he joined the faculty of Case Western Reserve University as the James H. Jewell Professor of Genetics.

In 2000, Chakravarti joined the Johns Hopkins University School of Medicine as the Henry J. Knott Professor and the inaugural Director of the McKusick-Nathans Institute of Genetic Medicine at Johns Hopkins. From 2007 to 2018 he served as director of the Center for Complex Disease Genomics at Johns Hopkins.

Chakravarti became director of the Center For Human Genetics & Genomics at New York University on 2 April 2, 2018.

== Research ==
Chakravarti has made contributions to human genetics in areas including population, statistical genetics, and the genetics of complex disease. He has developed important genomics methods that are now used worldwide, such as linkage disequilibrium mapping, His research has contributed to understanding linkage disequilibrium and genetic variation. He has combined population genetics and genomic technology to effectively address problems in medical genetics.

Chakravarti helped to identify the genetic mutation involved in cystic fibrosis and discovered a genetic variant related to autism. His methods have been used to identify recombination hotspots in hemoglobinopathies. Chakravarti also studies sudden cardiac death.

His team has studied Hirschsprung disease (HSCR) and determined the key genes and non-coding mutations responsible, demonstrating that the disease is caused by mutations of multiple genes. HSCR is now considered a model for the study of complex disease, in part due to Chakravarti's development of experimental techniques. This research may help researchers to better understand complex diseases such as schizophrenia and autism.

Chakravarti has been influential in genetics research projects including the Human Genome Project, 1000 Genomes and HapMap. As a member of the advisory council of the National Human Genome Research Institute, Chakravarti chaired the Human Genome Project from 1997 to 2000. He was involved in designing the population genetics sampling plan for the 1000 Genomes Project.

== Awards ==
- 2018, Chen Award, Human Genome Organization (HUGO)
- 2015, Member, National Academy of Sciences
- 2014, Member, American Association for the Advancement of Science
- 2013, William Allan Award, American Society of Human Genetics: This award is given out each year to a scientist who has made substantial contributions to understanding human genetics.
- 2008, Member, Indian Academy of Sciences
- 2007, Member, US National Academy of Medicine

== Gallery ==
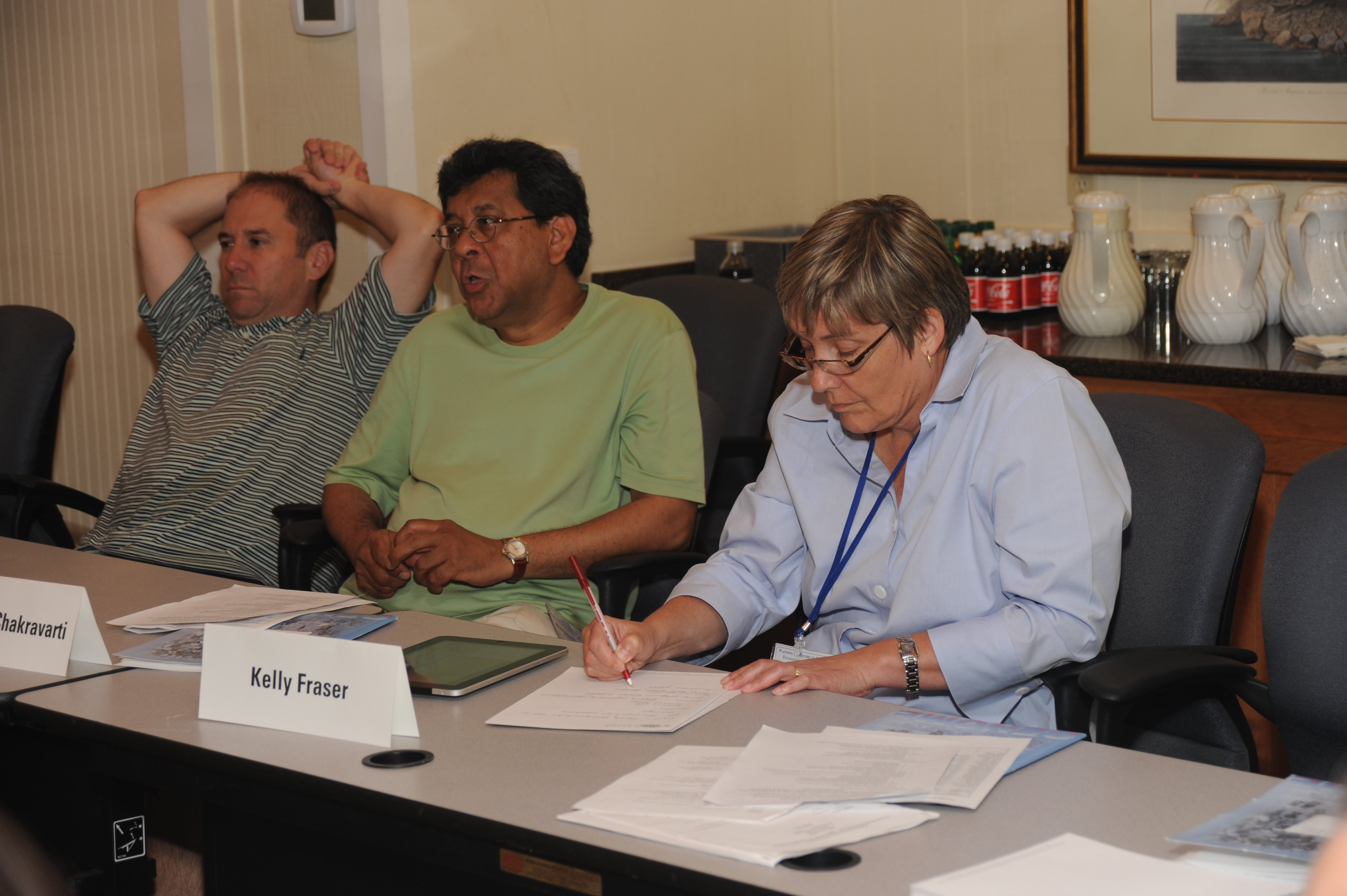

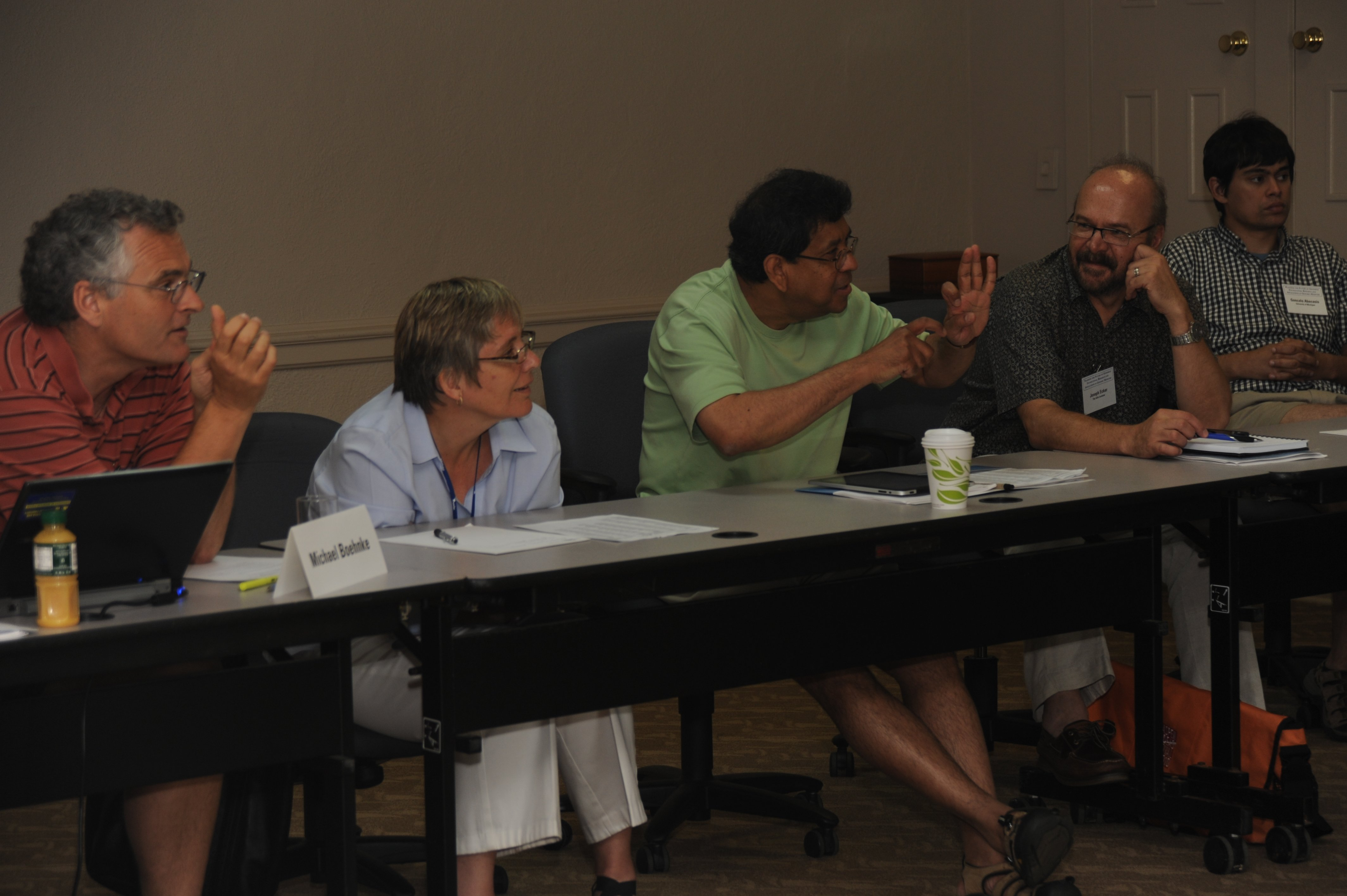
