= Annual Review =

Annual Review or Annual Reviews may refer to:

- An annual performance appraisal or performance review of an employee
- Annual Reviews (publisher), a publisher of academic journals
- The Annual Reviews series of journals, published by Annual Reviews (publisher), including:

- Annual Review of Analytical Chemistry
- Annual Review of Animal Biosciences
- Annual Review of Anthropology
- Annual Review of Astronomy and Astrophysics
- Annual Review of Biochemistry
- Annual Review of Biomedical Data Science
- Annual Review of Biomedical Engineering
- Annual Review of Biophysics
- Annual Review of Cancer Biology
- Annual Review of Cell and Developmental Biology
- Annual Review of Chemical and Biomolecular Engineering
- Annual Review of Clinical Psychology
- Annual Review of Computer Science
- Annual Review of Condensed Matter Physics
- Annual Review of Control, Robotics, and Autonomous Systems
- Annual Review of Criminology
- Annual Review of Developmental Psychology
- Annual Review of Earth and Planetary Sciences
- Annual Review of Ecology, Evolution, and Systematics
- Annual Review of Economics
- Annual Review of Entomology
- Annual Review of Environment and Resources
- Annual Review of Financial Economics
- Annual Review of Fluid Mechanics
- Annual Review of Food Science and Technology
- Annual Review of Genetics
- Annual Review of Genomics and Human Genetics
- Annual Review of Immunology
- Annual Review of Law and Social Science
- Annual Review of Linguistics
- Annual Review of Marine Science
- Annual Review of Materials Research
- Annual Review of Medicine
- Annual Review of Microbiology
- Annual Review of Neuroscience
- Annual Review of Nuclear and Particle Science
- Annual Review of Nutrition
- Annual Review of Organizational Psychology and Organizational Behavior
- Annual Review of Pathology: Mechanisms of Disease
- Annual Review of Pharmacology and Toxicology
- Annual Review of Physical Chemistry
- Annual Review of Physiology
- Annual Review of Phytopathology
- Annual Review of Plant Biology
- Annual Review of Political Science
- Annual Review of Psychology
- Annual Review of Public Health
- Annual Review of Resource Economics
- Annual Review of Sociology
- Annual Review of Statistics and Its Application
- Annual Review of Virology
- Annual Review of Vision Science

Other scientific reports and journals not published by Annual Reviews

- Annual Review of Applied Linguistics, published by Cambridge University Press
- Annual Review of Banking Law, published by Boston University
- Annual Review of Cognitive Linguistics, replaced by Review of Cognitive Linguistics since 2010, published by John Benjamins for the Spanish Cognitive Linguistics Association
- Annual Reviews in Control, formerly known as Annual Review in Automatic Programming, published by Elsevier for the International Federation of Automatic Control
- Annual Review of Critical Psychology published by the Centre for Qualitative and Theoretical Research on the Reproduction and Transformation of Language, Subjectivity and Practice
- Annual Review of Gerontology and Geriatrics, published by Springer Publishing
- Annual Review of Heat Transfer, published by Begell House
- Annual Review of Islam in Africa, formerly known as Annual Review of Islam in South Africa, published by the University of Cape Town
- Annual Review of Jazz Studies, published by Transaction Books
- Annual Review of Migration Studies, published by the Japan Immigration Society
- Annual Review of Nursing Research, published by Springer Publishing
- Annual Review of Nano Research published by World Scientific
- Annual Review of Population Law published by the Harvard Law School
- Annual Review of Sex Research published by Routledge on behalf of the Society for the Scientific Study of Sexuality
