= Thomas Gingeras =

American geneticist

- Education: Catholic University, New York University
- Known for: [ [identification of pervasive transcription of non-coding RNAs] [and] [ENCODE]]
- Spouse(s): [Hillary Sussman (current)], [Dorothy Gingeras]
- Children: [Ryan Gingeras, Alison Gingeras, Arie Gingeras]
- Scientific career
- Fields: Genomics
- Workplaces: Cold Spring Harbor Laboratory
- Thesis: Identification, isolation and characterization of the yolk proteins from Drosophila virilis and Drosophila melanogaster (1976)

Thomas Raymond Gingeras is an American geneticist and professor at Cold Spring Harbor Laboratory. He is a leader of the National Institutes of Health's ENCODE project. He worked at Affymetrix as Vice President of Biological Sciences before joining CSHL. In 2019, he was listed as an ISI Highly Cited Researcher. His son is the historian Ryan Gingeras.
