= 50th Independence Anniversary King's Medal =

Commemorative medal awarded by Papua New Guinea

- Obverse and reverse
- Type: Commemorative medal
- Country: Papua New Guinea
- Presented by: The Governor-General of Papua New Guinea
- First award: 2025
- Instituted by: Charles III, King of Papua New Guinea

Highlights
- Total: 3,000
- Ribbon bar

The 50th Independence Anniversary King's Medal is a commemorative medal to be awarded in 2025 to mark the 50th anniversary of the independence of Papua New Guinea on 16 September 1975.

The medal program was announced by the Governor-General of Papua New Guinea, Sir Bob Dadae, at Government House on 2 December 2024. The governor-general said that Charles III, King of Papua New Guinea, had approved the medal to honour and recognize Papua New Guineans who have made significant contributions to the country over the past 50 years.

== Design ==
The medal is in a round, gold-plated design. The obverse features a crowned effigy of King Charles III facing left, circumscribed by the inscription KING CHARLES III • PAPUA NEW GUINEA, with the year 2025 below the effigy. The reverse shows the royal cypher CIIIR surmounted by the Royal Crown, with the words 50th INDEPENDENCE • PAPUA NEW GUINEA and the dates 1975–2025 encircling the cypher.

The medal's ribbon includes red, gold, and black stripes.

The King's medal will be presented in a complete set that includes the regular medal, a miniature, and a ribbon bar.

== Eligibility ==
To be eligible for the King's medal, a person must meet the following criteria:

1. At least 25 years of meaningful service or contributions to Papua New Guinea.

2. Significant contributions in one or more of the following areas:

- Economic Development and Business
- Social Welfare
- Education and Training
- Health
- Environment and Conservation
- Culture and Tradition
- Church and Religion
- Sports
- Music and Entertainment
- Political (from LLG level to National Level)
- Community Services
- Disciplinary Forces

3. Exhibited credibility and strong leadership qualities, and mentored or inspired others to contribute to nation building.

4. Maintained a high standard of dignity, integrity and professionalism, and shown unwavering commitment to the values and principles of Papua New Guinea.

== Administration ==
The King's medal will be awarded to 3,000 individuals across Papua New Guinea.

The Honours and Awards Committee, chaired by Minister for Foreign Affairs, Justin Tkatchenko, under the Prime Minister's Department, will oversee the nomination process. All Papua New Guineans were invited to participate in the nomination process, which ended on 31 January 2025. The committee will finalize and publish the list of successful nominees by the end of April 2025.

Nominations were due by 31 January 2025. The first province to submit nominations was West New Britain, which did so 10 days before the deadline.

Beginning in June 2025, the governor-general, as the King's representative, will undertake medal presentation ceremonies in all the four regions of the country: Lae (Momase), Mount Hagen (Highlands), Kokopo (New Guinea Islands), and the National Capital District (Southern).

== See also ==
- Papua New Guinea Independence Medal
- Papua New Guinea honours system
- Monarchy of Papua New Guinea
