= Individualized cancer immunotherapy =

Therapeutic cancer vaccines personalized to a specific individual

Individualized cancer immunotherapy, also referred to as individualized immuno-oncology, is a novel concept for therapeutic cancer vaccines that are truly personalized to a single individual.

The human immune system is generally able to recognize and fight cancer cells. However, this ability is usually insufficient and the cancer continues to spread. Cancer immunotherapy is based on harnessing and potentiating the ability of the immune system to fight cancer.

Each tumor has its own individual genetic fingerprint, the mutanome, that includes numerous genetic alterations. As opposed to a preformed drug, individualized cancer vaccination is a therapy that targets specific cancer mutations of the individual patient's tumor. The production of vaccines tailored to match a person's individual constellation of cancer mutations has become a new field of research.

The concept of individualized cancer immunotherapy aims to identify individual mutations in the tumor of a patient, that are crucial for the proliferation, survival or metastasis of tumor cells. For this purpose, the individual genetic blueprint of the tumor is decrypted by sequencing and, using this blueprint as a template, a synthetic vaccine tailored to the tumor of the individual patient is prepared. This vaccine is designed to control and train the body's immune system to fight the cancer.

== Background ==
Cancer is characterized by an accumulation of genetic alterations. A tumor may acquire up to thousands of different somatic mutations during the process of initiation and progression. A smaller number of cancer mutations interfere with normal cell regulation and help to drive cancer growth.

Somatic mutations in the tumor genome can cause tumors to express mutant proteins (neoantigens) that are recognized by autologous T cells as foreign and constitute cancer vaccine targets. Tumor Mutational Burden (TMB, the number of mutations within a targeted genetic region in the cancerous cell's DNA) have been thus suggested to correlate with patient survival post immunotherapy, although the findings are disputed.

Such neoantigens are specifically expressed by tumor tissue and are not found on the surface of normal cells. They can upregulate tumor-specific T cells in patients without killing normal cells.

T cells are key effectors of anticancer immunity. They are capable of distinguishing tumor cells from normal ones by recognizing HLA-bound cancer-specific peptides. A requirement for the recognition of neoantigens by the immune system is that the neoantigens and their antigenic determinants, the neoepitopes, are processed and presented by human leukocyte antigen (HLA) molecules. These molecules may be recognized by CD8+ cytotoxic T lymphocytes as foreign neoepitopes and, with the help of CD4+ T lymphocytes, trigger an immune response leading to tumor-specific killing. CD8+ T cells are specialized for direct tumor cell killing. CD4+ T cells can interact with antigen-presenting cells such as dendritic cells to recruit other immune cells or stimulate effector cells.

Most cancer neoantigens in humans arise from unique mutations. A patient's cancer is intra- as well as interlesionally heterogeneous and changes its composition over time. Each patient has an individual mutational signature (mutanome), and only a very small portion of the mutations are shared between patients. A concept is therefore that an immunotherapy directed at neoantigens needs to be individualized.

The development of sequencing technology has improved the accuracy of identification and localization of neoantigens. With the advent of next-generation sequencing (NGS), it has become possible to systematically predict cancer neoantigens for individual patients.

== Preclinical research ==
In animal models, several independent studies have shown that vaccines consisting of computationally predicted neoepitopes mediated anti-tumor activity in mice.

== First-in-human clinical trials ==
The translation of individualized neoepitope vaccines into clinical oncology is under investigation. Formats under consideration for individualized vaccines are synthetic peptides, messenger RNA, DNA plasmids, viral vectors, engineered bacteria, and antigen-loaded dendritic cells.

=== Patients with melanoma ===
In 2015, a first step towards individualized neoantigen vaccination was achieved by treating three melanoma patients with autologous dendritic cells loaded with a personalized mixture of seven peptides (neoantigens) that were predicted to bind to human leukocyte antigens (HLA). The neoantigen-loaded dendritic cells were cultured in vitro for autologous transfusion. Results showed that the vaccine enhanced the existing immune response and elicited a neoantigen-specific T cell response that was not detected prior to injection.

Sahin et al. were the first to identify suitable neoantigens using next generation sequencing (NGS) and used them to produce customized RNA vaccines capable of encoding these neoantigens. A total of 13 patients with melanoma received the RNA vaccine, eight of which had no tumor development during the follow-up. Immune surveillance analysis of peripheral blood mononuclear cells (PBMCs) in patients demonstrated that the RNA vaccines expanded preexisting T cells and induced de novo T cell responses against neoepitopes not recognized prior to vaccination.

Another study group (Ott et al.) identified neoantigens in six melanoma patients and used them to create a customized vaccine for each patient with long peptides representing up to 20 mutations per patient. After surgical resection of the tumor, the vaccine was injected. The results showed that the tumor did not reappear in four patients during an observation period of 32 months after vaccination.

=== Patients with glioblastoma ===
Hilf et al. administered individualized neoantigen vaccines to 15 patients with glioblastoma. The vaccine triggered T cell immune responses to the predicted neoantigens.

Keskin et al. investigated individualized neoantigen vaccines in eight glioblastoma patients after surgical resection and conventional radiotherapy. The study group observed that the vaccine increased the number of tumor-infiltrating T cells that migrated from the peripheral blood into the brain.

== Manufacturing process of mutation-based vaccines ==
Individualized cancer vaccines typically consist of multiple predicted neoepitopes. The manufacturing process involves several steps.

Tumor biopsies and healthy tissue (e.g., peripheral blood cells) of a patient diagnosed with cancer are examined by NGS. Tumor-specific mutations in protein-coding genes are then identified by comparison of sequences from tumor and normal DNA. Computational tools classify these mutations for the highest likelihood of immunogenicity, that is, for the predicted expression and binding affinity of neoepitopes on HLA molecules. The top rankers are then used for the production of the vaccine.

The intended output is an on-demand vaccine with a unique composition tailored to the patient's individual cancer mutanome.

== Individualized NeoAntigen Specific Immunotherapy (iNeST) ==
The research approach to mobilize an immune response tailored to the individual tumor of a patient is also referred to as individualized neoantigen-specific immunotherapy (iNeST).

iNeST is based on the specific tumor mutations (neoantigens) of a single patient, with the aim of triggering high-affinity immune responses of T cells to the individual patient-specific cancer. The development of iNeST is driven by biotech companies
