= Timeline of the open-access movement =

Overview of the international movement for open access to scholarly communication

The following is a timeline of the international movement for open access to scholarly communication.

== 1940s-1990s ==
- 1942
  - American sociologist Robert King Merton declares: "Each researcher must contribute to the 'common pot' and give up intellectual property rights to allow knowledge to move forward."
- 1971
  - "World's first online digital library is launched, Project Gutenberg."
- 1987
  - Syracuse University in the US issues one of the world's first open access journals, New Horizons in Adult Education (ISSN 1062-3183).
- 1991
  - 14 August: ArXiv repository of physics research papers established at Los Alamos National Laboratory in the US.
- 1994
  - 27 June: Stevan Harnad posts a "Subversive Proposal" for authors to archive their articles for free for everyone online.
  - July 1994. Electronic Green Journal (EGJ) was launched by the University of Idaho Library. Since 2009 it is published by the University of California eScholarship. The EGJ is a peer-reviewed publication devoted to information about international sources on environmental protection, conservation, management of natural resources, and sustainability.
- 1998
  - Brazil-based SciELO (Scientific Electronic Library Online) launched.
  - Public Knowledge Project founded in Canada.
  - Scholarly Publishing and Academic Resources Coalition founded in North America.
- 1999
  - October: Open Archives Initiative on interoperability standards holds its first meeting, in New Mexico, US.

== 2000s ==
- 2000
  - BioMed Central publisher established.
- 2001
  - 15 January: Creative Commons founded in the United States.
  - Public Library of Science publisher active.
  - Open Journal Systems free software published.
  - SPARC Europe established to promote open access in Europe.
- 2002
  - 14 February: Budapest Open Access Initiative statement issued.
  - 28 June: US-based OAIster catalog begins.
- 2003
  - 11 April: Bethesda Statement on Open Access Publishing formed.
  - 22 October: Berlin Declaration on Open Access to Knowledge in the Sciences and Humanities published.
  - 25 December: Institutional Self-Archiving Policy Registry launched (later called ROARMAP).
  - Redalyc (Red de Revistas Científicas de América Latina y El Caribe, España y Portugal) established in Mexico.
- 2004
  - UK Digital Curation Centre founded.
  - Bielefeld Academic Search Engine launched by Bielefeld University, Germany.
  - Publisher Springer begins "hybrid option 'Open Choice' for their full portfolio of over 1,000 subscription journals."
  - 30 January: Organisation for Economic Co-operation and Development issues "Declaration on Access to Research Data from Public Funding."
- 2005
  - Directory of Open Access Repositories begins publication.
- 2007
  - European Research Council issues "its first Scientific Council Guidelines for open access."
- 2008
  - Durham Statement on Open Access to Legal Scholarship written.
  - 7 April: United States National Institutes of Health Public Access Policy effected.
  - July: Aaron Swartz releases the "Guerilla Open Access Manifesto", to send "a strong message against the privatization of knowledge".
- 2009
  - 12 January: European Commission-funded OpenAIRE project begins, supporting implementation of open access in Europe.
  - Confederation of Open Access Repositories founded.

== 2010s ==
- 2010
  - "Beall's list" of predatory open access publishers begins circulating.
- 2011
  - 20 January: #icanhazPDF begins on Twitter.
  - 5 September: Sci-Hub launched by Alexandra Elbakyan.
  - 16 December: United States Research Works Act bill introduced.
  - UK-based CORE (COnnecting REpositories) aggregation service founded.
- 2012
  - Knowledge Unlatched established.
  - Pasteur4OA (Open Access Policy Alignment Strategies for European Union Research) begins.
  - The Cost of Knowledge protest begins against high prices charged by large publisher Elsevier.
  - 22 October: Brussels Declaration signed, on open access to Belgian publicly funded research.
- 2013
  - PeerJ megajournal begins publication.
  - Registry of Research Data Repositories begins operating.
  - 4 October: "Who's Afraid of Peer Review?" published in Science.
- 2014
  - FOSTER Project (Facilitate Open Science Training for European Research) begins.
- 2016
  - 7 March: Open Data Button (browser extension) launched.
- 2017
  - April: UnpayWall Button (Browser extension) launched (90 million articles are indexed)
  - 10 October: Jussieu Call statement issued
  - Plug-in search tool Canary Haz launched to enable access to PDF versions of articles (later renamed Kopernio.com).

== See also ==
- Access to Knowledge movement
- History of open access
- Open access: history
- Timeline of free and open-source software

== Citations ==
- "Origins of OA". US: University of Pittsburgh. (Includes timeline)
- "History of", Open Access Tracking Project, Harvard University. Also: Milestones. (News feed)
- Peter Suber. "History of open access". Harvard University. Compilation of Peter Suber's contributions to the history of open access, 1992–present.
- "Timeline of the open access movement". Open Access Directory. This timeline was created and initially maintained by Peter Suber, who crowd-sourced it in February 2009 by moving it to the Open Access Directory.
