= National Platform Open Science =

The National Platform Open Science (NPOS) – (in Dutch: Nationaal Platform Open Science) – in The Netherlands is a collaboration of 17 Dutch organisations of higher education and research intent on realising Open Science. Among its members are the Umbrella organisation of Dutch universities (VSNU), the Royal Netherlands Academy of Arts and Sciences (KNAW), the Dutch Research Council (NWO), the National Library of the Netherlands (KB), and the like. The Platform brings together the parties that have initiated, formulated, or support the National Plan Open Science, that has been presented to the Dutch government in the beginning of 2017.

== Ambition ==
NPOS aims to promote open access to scholarly literature and re-use of research data, and has appointed the ex-Rector Magnificus, Karel Luyben, (President, or in the UK also Vice-Chancellor) of the Delft University of Technology in The Netherlands as National Coordinator Open Science. The organisation aims to reform the manner in which researchers are assessed in such a way that the assessment stimulates open science.

NPOS notes a lack of openness in the scientific culture demonstrated, for instance, by published articles describing research paid for by public funds and of interest to a wide audience habitually being behind paywalls, or access to them being otherwise encumbered. In addition to that, the publish or perish culture prevalent in science incentivises researchers to publish, as much as possible, in journals with a high citation score. And finally, the organisation is drawing attention to the lack of research data stewardship, as a result of which valuable data sets regularly are being lost, research cannot be replicated, or experiments need to be carried out again without the benefit of being able to use what has been done before.

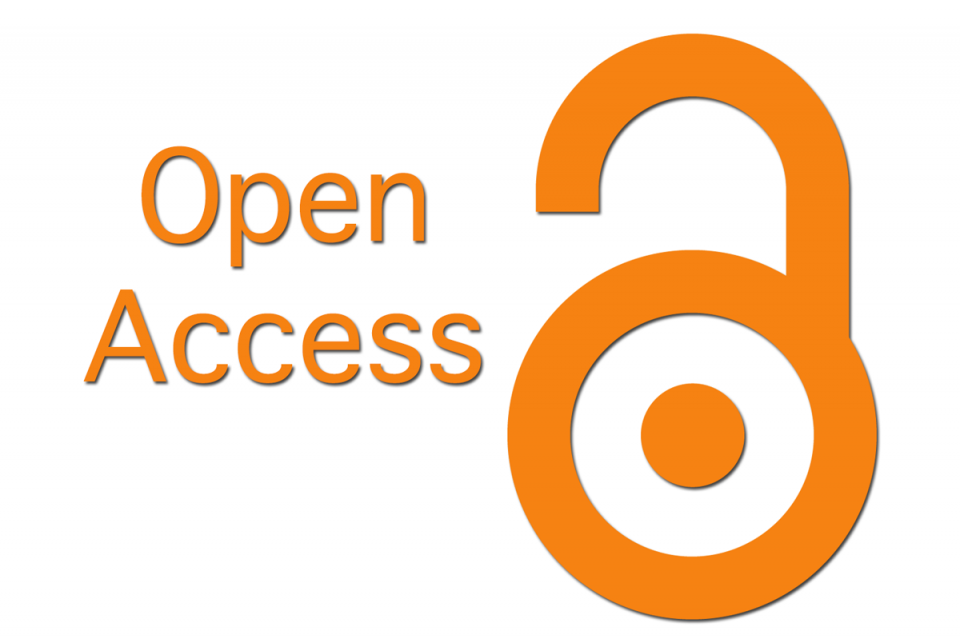

== Background ==
The ideal of open access to scientific research results is a worldwide ambition in the scientific world and has been around for a few decades, but progress is considered too slow, as the Budapest Open Access Initiative was already launched in 2001 followed, in 2003, by the Bethesda Statement on Open Access Publishing and subsequently by a whole series of other, similar, declarations. The issue is gradually reaching the agendas of government policy in countries, states, and supra-national organisations such as the EU, and in 2013 this was the case in The Netherlands, where the government declared that open access to published results must be the standard for scientific research carried out in the country. In 2016, during its stint as EU chair, the Dutch government organised a conference on open science, upon which a report was published entitled Amsterdam Call for Action on Open Science.
