= Deborah J. Lucas =

American economist

Deborah J. Lucas is an American economist who works in the MIT Sloan School of Management as Sloan Distinguished Professor of Finance and director of the Golub Center for Finance and Policy; she is also a research affiliate of the National Bureau of Economic Research and Asian Bureau of Finance and Economic Research. Her research interests include the evaluation of governmental financial activity; she has also published work on portfolio optimization, asset pricing, and information privilege.

== Education and career ==
Lucas studied economics at the University of Chicago, receiving a bachelor's degree in 1980, a master's degree in 1983, and a Ph.D. in 1986.

She became an assistant professor at the Kellogg School of Management of Northwestern University from 1985 to 1992, John L. and Helen Kellogg Distinguished Associate Professor from 1992 to 1996, and Donald C. Clark HSBC Professor of Consumer Finance from 1996 to 2009. She chaired the Department of Finance from 1996 to 1998. During this period she was also a visiting assistant professor at the MIT Sloan School of Management in 1990–1991, a senior staff economist at the Council of Economic Advisers in 1992–1993, and chief economist of the Congressional Budget Office in 2000–2001. She became a faculty research fellow of the National Bureau of Economic Research in 1992, and a research associate in 1998.

In 2009, she moved to her present position at the MIT Sloan School of Management, where she received the Sloan Distinguished Professorship of Finance in 2011 and became director of the MIT Golub Center for Finance and Policy in 2012. She also continued to work with the Congressional Budget Office, on leave from MIT, as associate director in 2009–2010 and as assistant director for financial analysis in 2010–2011.

== Recognition ==
Lucas was elected to the National Academy of Social Insurance in 2003, and elected as a Fellow of the National Academy of Public Administration in 2018. She became a Fellow of the Econometric Society in 2024.
