= Subversive Proposal =

The "Subversive Proposal" was an Internet posting by Stevan Harnad on June 27, 1994 (presented at the 1994 Network Services Conference in London) calling on all authors of "esoteric" research writings to archive their articles for free for everyone online (in anonymous FTP archives or websites). It initiated a series of online exchanges, many of which were collected and published as a book in 1995: Scholarly Journals at the Crossroads: A Subversive Proposal for Electronic Publishing. This led to the creation in 1997 of Cogprints, an open access archive for self-archived articles in the cognitive sciences and in 1998 to the creation of the American Scientist Open Access Forum (initially called the "September98 Forum" until the founding of the Budapest Open Access Initiative which coined the term "open access"). The Subversive Proposal also led to the development of the GNU EPrints software used for creating OAI-compliant open access institutional repositories, and inspired CiteSeer, a tool to locate and index the resulting eprints.

The proposal was updated gradually across the years, as summarized in the American Scientist Open Access Forum on its 10th anniversary. A retrospective was written by Richard Poynder. A self-critique was posted on its 15th anniversary in 2009. An online interview of Stevan Harnad was conducted by Richard Poynder on the occasion of the 20th anniversary of the subversive proposal.
