= Access to Knowledge movement =

Social movement

The Access to Knowledge (A2K) movement is a loose collection of civil society groups, governments, and individuals converging on the idea that access to knowledge should be linked to fundamental principles of justice, freedom, and economic development.

== History ==
The Berlin Declaration on Open Access to Knowledge in the Sciences and Humanities from 2003 is a major declaration reflecting the goals of the movement pertaining to academic publishing.

In October 2004, the Geneva Declaration on the Future of the World Intellectual Property Organization emerged from a call from Brazil and Argentina for a development agenda for the World Intellectual Property Organization and was supported by hundreds of organizations. Supporters included the Free Software Foundation, with a statement Towards a "World Intellectual Wealth Organization": Supporting the Geneva Declaration.

One of the proposals of the declaration was a "call for a Treaty on Access to Knowledge and Technology. The Standing Committee on Patents and the Standing Committee on Copyright and Related Rights should solicit views from member countries and the public on elements of such a treaty".

A shared discussion platform on A2K issues is the mailing list of that name, which was initiated around discussion of the Geneva declaration. A draft "A2K treaty" was later produced. The proposed treaty is intended to ease the transfer of knowledge to developing nations, and to secure the viability of open innovation systems all over the world.

=== Human rights debate ===
Access to knowledge and science is protected by Article 27 of the Universal Declaration of Human Rights. The article balances the right of access with a right to protection of moral and material interests:

Article 27

Everyone has the right freely to participate in the cultural life of the community, to enjoy the arts and to share in scientific advancement and its benefits.

Everyone has the right to the protection of the moral and material interests resulting from any scientific, literary or artistic production of which he is the author.

A2K academics argue that "material interests" are not simply equivalent to current intellectual property provisions, not least because these rights are saleable and transferable, and therefore not "inalienable". The right to access is ultimately the more important part of the right. Current levels of IP protection seem out of balance with Article 27, according to A2K theorists:

... in a very real sense, rights delayed are rights denied. Had access to oral rehydration therapy and second-generation vaccine technologies been delayed for twenty years ... three million children would have died. Even for less life-and-death technologies, a twenty-year delay works an immense limitation on enjoyment of the right. For cultural works, the situation is even worse; protection lasts longer than a human lifetime.

== Supporters ==
=== Knowledge Ecology International ===
CP Tech (now Knowledge Ecology International) say: "the A2K (Access to Knowledge) movement takes concerns with copyright law and other regulations that affect knowledge and places them within an understandable social need and policy platform: access to knowledge goods."

=== Consumers International ===
Many different groups refer to the A2K movement. Consumers International is particularly prominent, running a dedicated domain, and defines the movement as:

the umbrella term for a movement that aims to create more equitable public access to the products of human culture and learning. The ultimate objective of the movement is to create a world in which educational and cultural works are accessible to all, and in which consumers and creators alike participate in a vibrant ecosystem of innovation and creativity.

These goals are of interest to a broad coalition of consumer groups, NGOs, activists, Internet users and others. For many of them, coming to grips with the issues involved in the A2K movement can be daunting. These issues, including copyright and patent law reform, open content licensing, and communications rights, often involve legal and technological concepts that even specialists find difficult.

== See also ==
- Access2Research
- Academic journal publishing reform
- Free culture movement
- Information privilege
- Open access
- Open knowledge
- Right to education
- Timeline of the open access movement
