= Danner =

Danner is a surname. Notable persons with the surname include:

- Blythe Danner (born 1943), American actress
- Christian Danner (born 1958), German race car driver
- Edward Danner (1900–1970), American politician from Nebraska
- Hagen Danner (born 1998), American baseball player
- Joel Buchanan Danner (1804–1885), American politician from Pennsylvania
- Mark Danner (born 1958), American writer, journalist, and educator
- Countess Danner or Louise Rasmussen (1815–1874), Danish ballet dancer and stage actor, wife of Frederick VII of Denmark
- Pat Danner (born 1934), American politician from Missouri
- Richard Danner (1947–2018), American law professor

== Fictional characters ==
- Hugo Danner, a fictional character in the novel Gladiator by Philip Gordon Wylie

== See also ==
- Danner Boots, a footwear brand owned by ABC-Mart of Japan.
