= Geneva Accord =

Geneva Accord may refer to:

- Geneva Statement on Ukraine, an agreement to de-escalate the 2014 pro-Russian unrest in Ukraine
- Geneva interim agreement on Iranian nuclear program, an interim agreement on Iranian nuclear program between the P5+1 and Iran
- Geneva Initiative (2003), a peace plan in the Israeli-Palestinian conflict also referred to as the Geneva Accord
- Geneva Accord (1991), a peace plan in the Croatian War of Independence
- Geneva Accords (1988), a settlement that concerned Afghanistan
- Geneva Accords (1954), a plan concerning Indochina and Vietnam
- German-Polish Accord on East Silesia (Geneva Accord 1922), a bilateral treaty between Germany and Poland on the division of Silesia
- Geneva Frequency Plan of 1975

== See also ==
- Geneva Conventions
- Geneva Conference
- Geneva Declaration
