= Bioline =

Bioline may refer to:

- BioLineRx, an Israeli drug development company
- Bioline International, a non-profit publishing cooperative
- Bioline Reagents, a UK company supplying molecular biology products
