= Catherine G. Wolf =

American psychologist and computer scientist

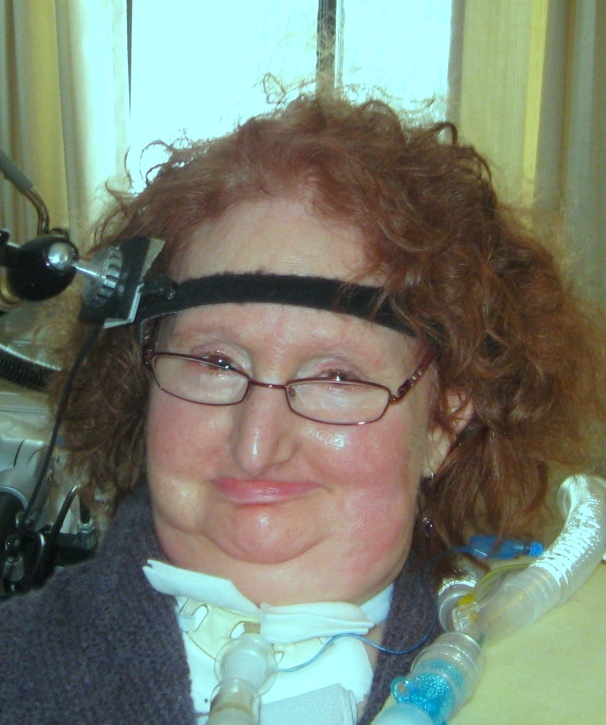
- When Wolf raises her eyebrows, the black band around her forehead rises, and triggers her switch.
- Born: May 25, 1947; Washington, D.C., United States
- Died: February 7, 2018 (aged 70); Katonah, New York
- Education: Tufts University, Brown University
- Known for: Human-computer interaction, ALS research
- Awards: Tufts University Distinguished Service Award
- Scientific career
- Fields: Psychology, Computer science
- Workplaces: IBM
- Doctoral advisor: Peter D. Eimas

Catherine Gody Wolf (May 25, 1947 – February 7, 2018) was an American psychologist and expert in human-computer interaction. She was the author of more than 100 research articles and held six patents in the areas of human-computer interaction, artificial intelligence, and collaboration. Wolf was known for her work at IBM's Thomas J. Watson Research Center in Yorktown Heights, NY, where she was a 19-year staff researcher.

In the late 1990s, Wolf was diagnosed with Amyotrophic lateral sclerosis (ALS), better known as Lou Gehrig's disease. Despite a rapid physical deterioration, Wolf was still able to communicate with the world via electronic sensory equipment, including a sophisticated brain-computer interface. Remarkably, with almost no voluntary physical functions remaining, she published novel research into the fine-scale abilities of ALS patients.

== Education ==
Wolf completed her undergraduate degree at Tufts University, where she majored in psychology. In 1967 she met her future husband, Joel Wolf, then a student at the Massachusetts Institute of Technology. Both continued on to graduate school at Brown University, where Catherine focused her research on the way that children perceive speech. After Brown, Wolf completed additional postgraduate work at MIT before entering the workforce as a full-time researcher.

== Career ==
Wolf's career focused on human-computer interaction. In 1977, she joined Bell Labs, where she became a human factors manager. Eight years later, she began her tenure as a research psychologist at the Thomas J. Watson Research Center, IBM's research headquarters. During her time at IBM, Wolf was particularly interested in learning how people interact with software in the workplace. In response to behaviors she observed, she designed and tested new interface systems in which speech and handwritten words could be converted to digital information. Among other technologies, Wolf worked on a system known as the Conversation Machine, which was the precursor of today's phone banking systems: users could access their accounts by conversing with an automated voice system. She also published papers on the sharing of information in the workplace and search in the context of technical support.

In all, Wolf held title to six patents and more than 100 research articles. In 1997, she was diagnosed with ALS, a.k.a. Lou Gehrig's disease, which eventually prevented her from performing her normal work duties. Wolf went on long-term disability leave in 2004 and officially retired from IBM in 2012. Even after losing almost all muscle function, however, Wolf still contributed to research on human-computer interaction. She also did work with the Wadsworth Center, part of the New York State Department of Health, as a tester of various systems. In 2009, Wolf also published a research article extending a scale commonly used to assess the progression of ALS (known as the ALSFRS-R) to more finely assess the abilities of people with advanced ALS. This paper added significantly to the understanding of what ALS patients might be capable of even after most of their muscle function has been lost.

== Living with ALS ==
Wolf first felt symptoms of ALS in 1996, when her foot wouldn't flex properly. She was positively diagnosed with ALS a year later.

In 2001, Wolf decided to have a tracheotomy, a surgical procedure that permanently attached a breathing tube in her neck, allowing her to breathe without the use of her nose or mouth.

Wolf eventually lost the use of all of her muscles except a few in her face and eyes. To communicate, she used a computer system which translated movement of her eyebrows into text. She was adept at communicating in this way, even if though she could only "type" out one or two words a minute. She wrote poetry, sent emails, conducted occasional interviews, and wrote articles for such outlets as Neurology Now. She was even able to stay active on Facebook.

Concurrent with the loss of her muscle control, Wolf became increasingly an expert on brain-computer interface (BCI) systems, and helped other researchers learn more about how such systems can work. She was aware that she might lose the ability to communicate with her eyebrows, so she worked with scientists on an EEG-based interface system for herself, if that day came. EEG (electroencephalography) measures voltage fluctuations along the scalp that result from neuron activity in the brain. With such a setup in place, Wolf hoped to communicate words simply by focusing her thoughts on one letter at a time. Wolf provided researchers with important feedback about BCI's, since they didn't work flawlessly.

== Personal ==
Wolf was married to Joel Wolf, a mathematician at IBM's TJ Watson Research Center. They had two daughters, Laura and Erika, and several grandchildren.

On April 26, 2003, Wolf was honored with a Distinguished Service Award from her alma mater, Tufts University, for "the ideal of citizenship and public service."

On February 7, 2018, Wolf died at her home in Katonah, New York at the age of 70.
