= Timeline of free and open-source software =

This article presents a timeline of events related to popular free/open-source software. For a narrative explaining the overall development, see the related history of free and open-source software.

The Achievements column documents achievements a project attained at some point in time (not necessarily when it was first released).

== 1970s ==
Date	Project	Event	Achievements
1974	University Ingres	One of the first relational databases, developed at Berkeley.	POSTGRES evolved from the Ingres project.
1976	Emacs	The original EMACS was a set of Editor MACroS for the TECO editor written in 1976 by Richard Stallman, initially together with Guy L. Steele Jr. Later in 1984 the GNU Emacs was released under a GNU General Public License.	Longest continuously-developed GNU project
1978, March	BSD	Bill Joy started compiling the first Berkeley Software Distribution (1BSD)	
1979, May	C shell	Written by Bill Joy for 2BSD.	

== 1980s ==
Date	Project	Event	Achievements
1980, November	delivermail	Written by Eric Allman, is a mail transport agent that used the FTP protocol on the early ARPANET to transmit e-mail to the recipient.	
1982	TeX	Originally written by Donald Knuth in 1978, the new version of TeX was rewritten from scratch and was published in 1982.	One of the longest continuously-developed open source projects
1983, April	sendmail	Written by Eric Allman as a replacement for delivermail.	Full support for Simple Mail Transfer Protocol
1983, September	GNU Project	Announced by Richard Stallman on Usenet as a project to create a "Free Unix"	Became the standard userland for Linux (c. 1991); USENIX Lifetime Achievement Award (2001)
1984	X Window System	X originated at MIT in 1984. The current protocol version, X11, appeared in September 1987. The X.Org Foundation now leads the X project, with the current reference implementation, X.org Server, available as free software under the MIT License and similar permissive licenses.	Most popular windowing system implementation for desktop Linux and all Unix operating systems, excluding Mac OS X
1985	POSTGRES	Michael Stonebraker returned to Berkeley in 1985, and began a post-Ingres project to address the problems with contemporary database systems that had become increasingly clear during the early 1980s.	
1985, May	patch	Written by Larry Wall, and posted to mod.sources, it's a tool that applies changes generated by diff.	It allow developers to cooperate by passing patch sets instead of entire source code files.
1987	GCC	Written by Richard Stallman with contributions from others as the C compiler for the GNU Project. Later the project would be known as the GNU Compiler Collection.	
1987	Perl	Perl, the dynamic programming language was created by Larry Wall and first released in 1987.	
1988	Bash	Brian Fox began coding Bash on January 10, 1988, after Richard Stallman became dissatisfied with the lack of progress being made by a prior developer.	
1989, June	Berkeley; Software; Distribution (BSD)	Networking Release 1 (Net/1) made available to non-licensees of AT&T code, as freely redistributable under the terms of BSD licenses.	

== 1990s ==
Date	Project	Event	Achievements
1990	Zsh	Paul Falstad wrote the first version of Zsh in 1990.	
1991, June	BSD	Networking Release 2 (Net/2) was made available to non-licensees of AT&T code and was freely redistributable under the terms of the BSD license.	
1991, October	Linux kernel	Started by Linus Torvalds, Since the initial release of its source code in 1991, it would grow from a small number of C files under a license prohibiting commercial distribution to its state in 2007 of about 290 megabytes of source under the GNU General Public License.	Many, including: Most popular kernel used by top 500 supercomputers. Most popular kernel in mobile devices sold in 2013.
1991	Python	First release by Guido van Rossum.	
1992	386BSD	Written mainly by Berkeley alumni Lynne Jolitz and William Jolitz; public releases begun.	
1992	Samba	Andrew Tridgell developed the first version of Samba in 1992, at the Australian National University.	
1993, March	NetBSD	Project began as a result of frustration in 386BSD developer community with pace and direction of that operating system's development. The four founders of the project are Chris Demetriou, Theo de Raadt, Adam Glass, Charles Hannum.	
1993	Lua	Created by Roberto Ierusalimschy, Luiz Henrique de Figueiredo, and Waldemar Celes, members of the Computer Graphics Technology Group (Tecgraf) at the Pontifical Catholic University of Rio de Janeiro, Brazil.	
1993, August	R	First release by Ross Ihaka and Robert Gentleman at University of Auckland, New Zealand.	
1993, Dec	FreeBSD	FreeBSD's development began in 1993 with a quickly growing, unofficial patchkit maintained by users of the 386BSD operating system. The first official release was FreeBSD 1.0 in December 1993.	
1993	Wine	Bob Amstadt (the initial project leader) and Eric Youngdale started the project in 1993 as a way to run Windows applications on Linux.	Now able to run vast numbers of Windows applications and video games
1994, March	Linux Journal	First issue of the first computer magazine dedicated to Linux.	
1994, March	BSD	4.4BSD-Lite was released that no longer require a USL source license.	
1995, June	BSD	4.4BSD-Lite 2, final release from CSRG Berkeley	Basis of modern BSDs
1995, June	PHP	Originally created by Rasmus Lerdorf in 1994, it was released publicly in June 1995.	Formed part of the most popular web development stack (LAMP) in the 1990s and 2000s
1995	GIMP	Created by Spencer Kimball and Peter Mattis, the project originally stood for General Image Manipulation Program.	Used by Hollywood, in the forked form of CinePaint (formerly known as Film Gimp)
1995	Ruby	Created by Yukihiro Matsumoto, the programming language drew greater attention in the 2000s due to the Ruby on Rails web development framework	Became extremely popular with internet startups
1996	Apache	The first version of the Apache web server was created by Robert McCool, who was heavily involved with the NCSA web server, known simply as NCSA HTTPd.	Most popular web server
1996	KDE	KDE was founded in 1996 by Matthias Ettrich, who was then a student at the Eberhard Karls University of Tübingen.	
1997, August	GNOME	The initial project leaders for GNOME were Miguel de Icaza and Federico Mena.	
1999, August	OpenOffice.org	Originally developed as the proprietary software application suite StarOffice by the German company StarDivision, the code was purchased in 1999 by Sun Microsystems. The code was made available free of charge in August 1999. On July 19, 2000, Sun Microsystems announced that it was making the source code of StarOffice available for download under both the LGPL and the Sun Industry Standards Source License (SISSL)	

== 2000s ==
Date	Project	Event	Achievements
2000	LLVM	Compiler toolkit, started at the University of Illinois at Urbana–Champaign. Initially a research project and known as "Low-Level Virtual Machine".	Adopted by Apple as their primary compilation platform for Mac OS X
2001	Free Software Foundation Europe	Founded to support free software and oppose software patents in Europe	Theodor Heuss Medal (2010)
2002	Blender	Formerly proprietary software, released as open source in 2002 after a crowdfunding campaign	
2002	MediaWiki	There was no name for the project, until the Wikimedia Foundation was announced in June 2003, when name MediaWiki was coined by a Wikipedia contributor.	Integral to the development of Wikipedia
2003, February	New Zealand Open Source Society	New Zealand Open Source Society (NZOSS), a non-profit organization and incorporated society began with a suggestive letter by David Lane to the government, along with 400 supporters signatures to begin the advancement of open software in New Zealand.	
2003, April	Firefox	Descended from the Mozilla Application Suite, the project started as an experimental branch of the Mozilla Project. Originally titled Phoenix, then renamed as Firebird, the project was finally named Mozilla Firefox. The version 1.0 was released on November 9, 2004.	The second most popular web browser in the world until 2012.
2003, May	WordPress	a free and open-source content management system (CMS) written in PHP and paired with a MySQL or MariaDB database.	Most popular content management system in the world
2004	Ubuntu	a user friendly linux distro	
2005	Git	Created by Linux founder Linus Torvalds	World's most popular distributed revision control system
2008, September	Chromium	Released by Google	Forms the majority of the code in Google Chrome, the most popular web browser in the world
2008	Android	Released by Google	Most popular mobile platform in the world
2009	ChromiumOS	Released by Google	Has since enjoyed popular use in types of devices known as Chromebooks and Chromeboxes

By the 2000s the number of open source software packages in wide use was so large that it would be infeasible to make a definitive list.

== 2010s ==
Date	Project	Event	Achievements
2010, March	Linaro	Founded	
2010	LibreOffice	LibreOffice is released; a free open office suite including applications such as word processing, spreadsheets, drawing and database.	Available in over 100 languages.
2010	Android	Becomes most popular smartphone operating system (OS), later became most popular general purpose OS overall.	
2011	Git	Microsoft survey of 1,000 software developers reveals that Git is the most popular version control system among developers	
2011	Bootstrap	Free CSS and JavaScript development starting kit, released by Twitter	Becomes most popular repository on GitHub (2012)
2012	Google Chrome, based on Chromium	Overtakes Internet Explorer to become most widely used web browser, according to StatCounter	
2013	Firefox OS	Mobile phone operating system, released by Mozilla Foundation	
2013 (Q2)	Android	Overtakes iOS to become most popular tablet operating system	
2013, September	SteamOS	Valve's new Linux-based operating system for its Steambox consoles, intended to promote Linux gaming and spread Linux adoption in the high-end video game sector	
2014, February	Vue.js	The JavaScript framework Vue.js is released	Becomes most popular JavaScript framework on GitHub
2019, July	Debian	Debian 10 "Buster" is released	

== 2020s ==
Date	Project	Event	Achievements
2020, June	Linux	The Linux operating systems market share breaks the 3% marker for the first time in June 2020, reaching 3.57% in July 2020.	

== See also ==
- History of free and open-source software
- List of free and open-source software packages
- Timeline of programming languages – many programming languages are open source
- Timeline of operating systems – quite a few operating systems are open source
- Timeline of Linux adoption
- Timeline of the open-access movement
- History of Linux
  - Linux kernel § History
