= Animal Sentience (journal) =

Peer-reviewed academic journal

- Discipline: Ethics, animal behavior
- Language: English
- Edited by: Stevan Harnad

Publication details
- History: 2016–present
- Publisher: WellBeing International
- Open access: Yes
- License: CC BY

Standard abbreviations
- ISO 4: Anim. Sentience

Indexing
- ISSN: 2377-7478
- LCCN: 2015201663
- OCLC no.: 1002278624

Links
- Journal homepage

Animal Sentience: An Interdisciplinary Journal on Animal Feeling is a peer-reviewed academic journal. Its subject matter, animal sentience, concerns what and how nonhuman animals think and feel as well as the scientific and scholarly methods of investigating it and conveying the findings to the general public. The initial publisher was the Animal Studies Repository of the Institute for Science and Policy of The Humane Society of the United States, now the Animal Studies Repository of WellBeing International. The editor-in-chief is Stevan Harnad.

== History ==
The 2012 Cambridge Declaration on Consciousness led to many scientists acknowledging that animals other than humans can feel subjectively and experience qualia. In response to this, in 2014, the Institute for Science and Policy decided to create a peer-reviewed journal focused on animal sentience. The first issue of Animal Sentience appeared in 2016. A target article on pain in fish in the inaugural issue drew 45 commentary articles as well as media attention.

== Publication model ==
All articles accepted for publication are open to open peer commentary, in which multiple researchers may submit mini-articles criticizing, clarifying, or elaborating on the article from the viewpoint of any research field relevant to its content.

== See also ==
- Biosemiotics (journal)
