= Ng'iya Girls High School =

National school in Siaya County, Kenya

Coordinates: 0.0400°N 34.3716°E

Ng'iya Girls High School is a girls' national school in Ng'iya Township, Siaya County, in Western Kenya.

== History and operations ==
The school was founded in 1923 as a primary school. In 1953 it became a teacher training college (TTC). In 1962, Ng'iya Girls became a secondary school and admitted its first form one students who sat their “O” level exams in 1965.

In 1971, it enrolled the first A-Level science class offering Science and Arts A-Level classes. This continued till 1989, when the A-level system was phased out.

The school was identified as a Centre of Excellence in 2010, and officially promoted to a national school in 2012.

In 2018, it was closed after it was damaged by students protesting the school's management.

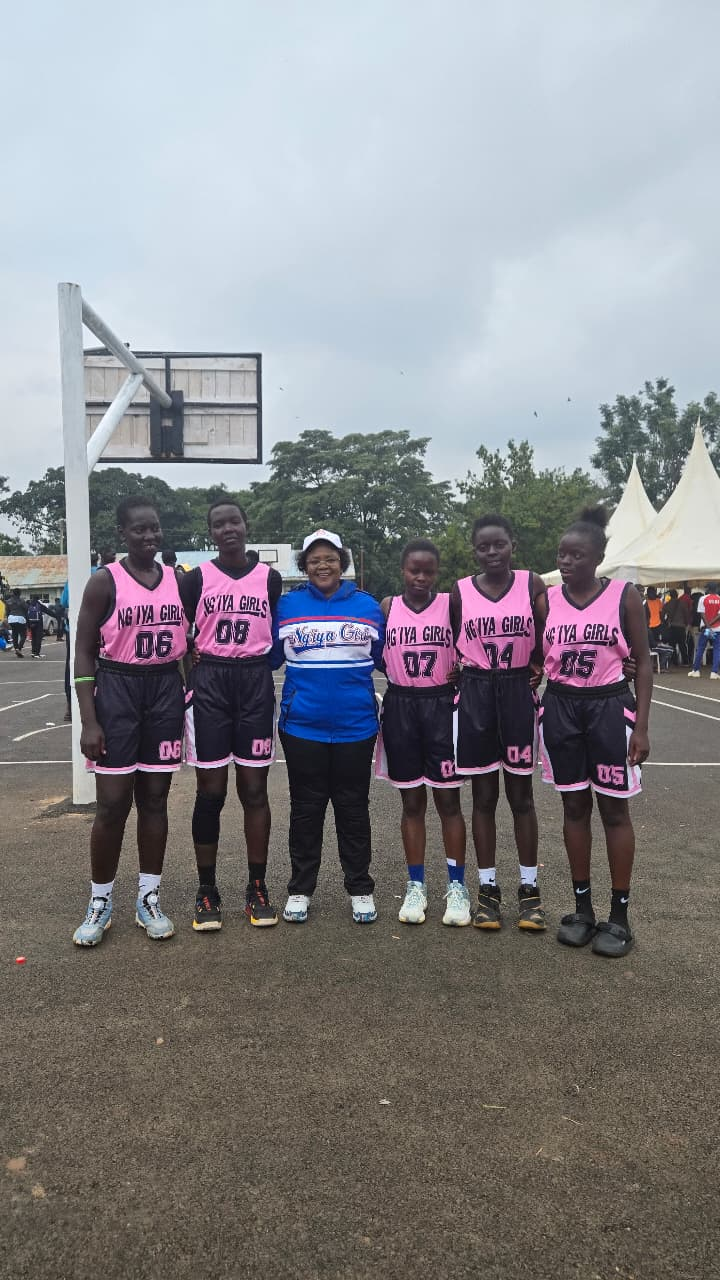
Ng'iya Girls - The 2025 East African Basketball Champions

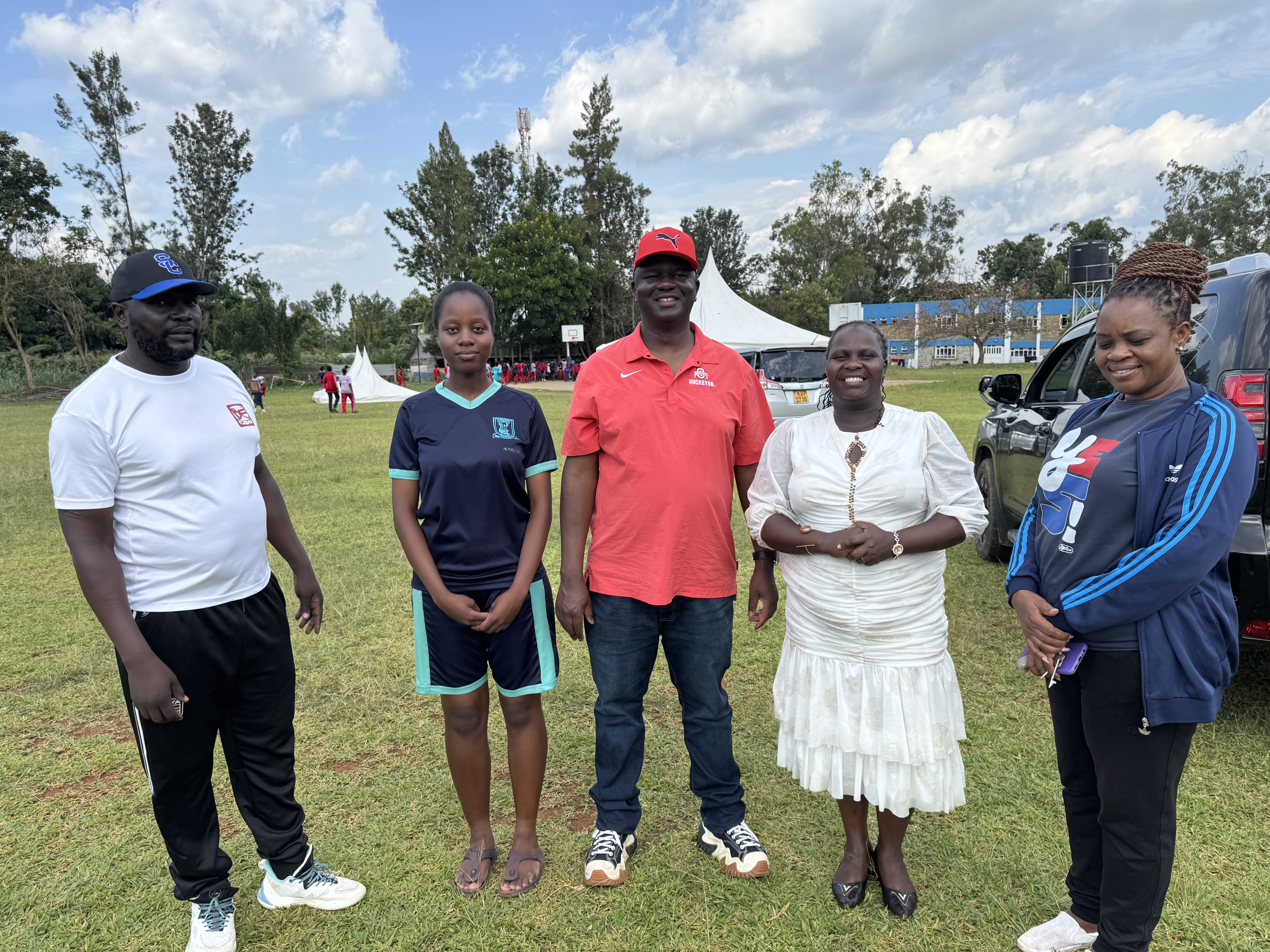
Celebrated motivational speaker Pastor Salina (second from right) during her tour of Ng'iya Girls on June 6 2026.

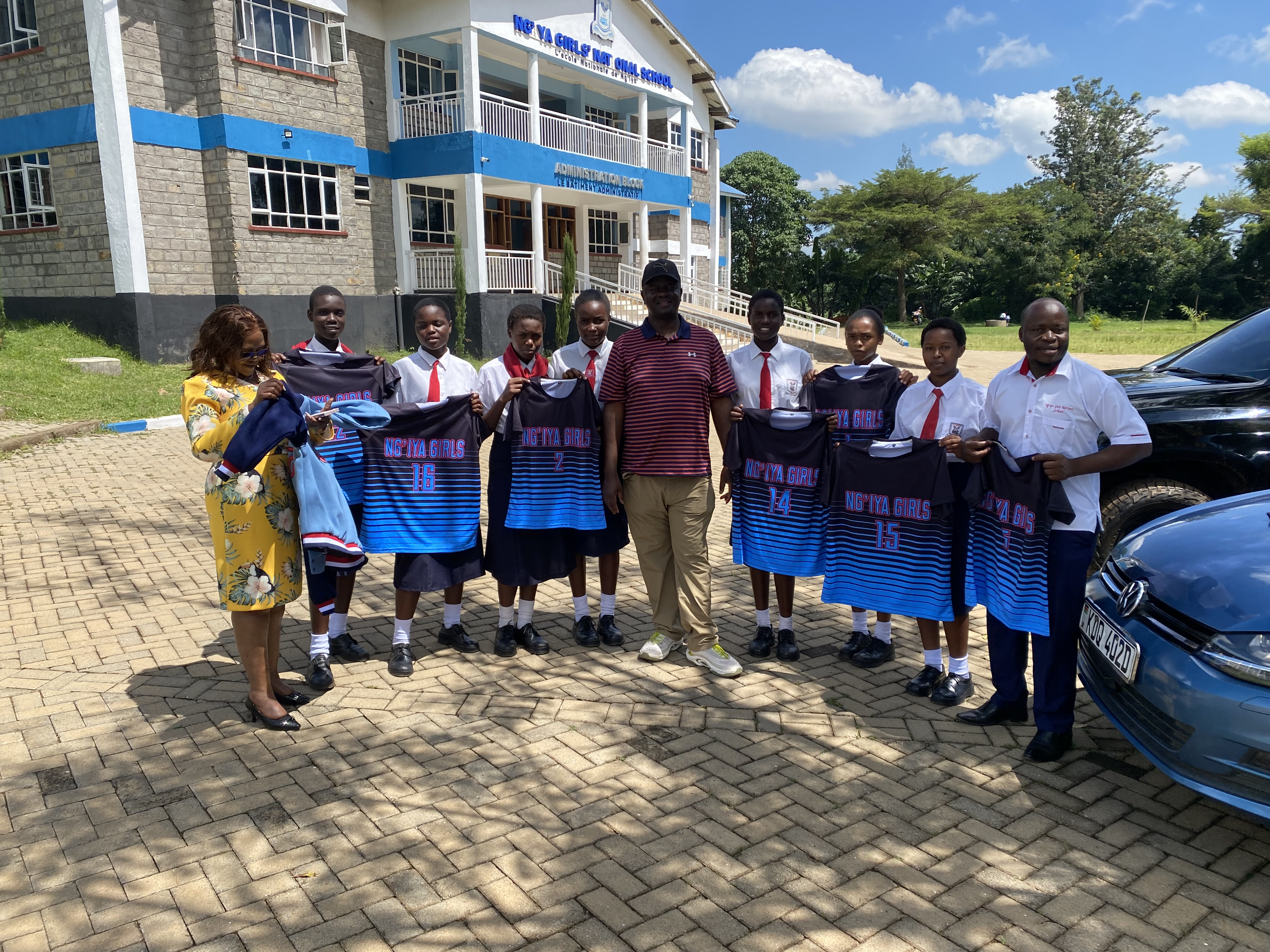
Chief Principal of Ng'iya Girls, Hellen Juma, admiring new hockey uniforms on June 5 2026. The uniforms were donated by Dr. Ojwang (a friend of the school).

== Notable alumnae ==
- Grace Ogot, author, nurse, journalist, politician and diplomat
- Mary Abukutsa-Onyango, humanitarian and agricultural scientist
- Grace Onyango, politician

== See also ==
- Education in Kenya
- List of schools in Kenya
