= Stevan Harnad =

Canadian cognitive scientist (born 1945)

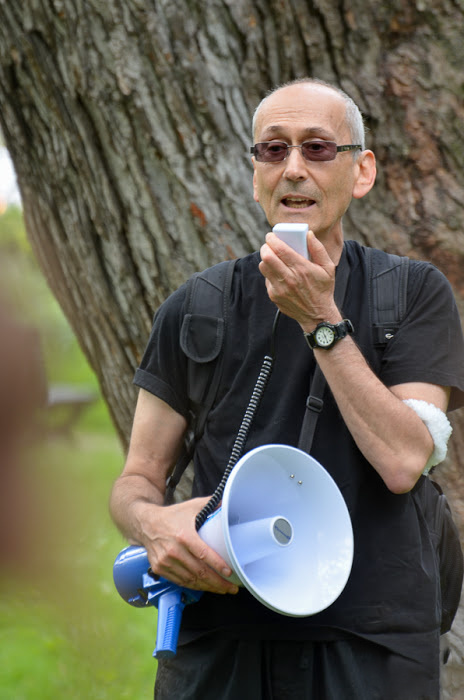
- Harnad in 2014
- Born: 1945 (age 80–81); Budapest, Hungary
- Citizenship: Canadian
- Education: McGill University, Princeton University
- Known for: EPrints
- Scientific career
- Fields: Cognitive science
- Workplaces: Université du Québec à Montréal, University of Southampton
- Thesis: Grounding Symbolic Representation in Categorical Perception (1992)
- Website: www.ecs.soton.ac.uk/people/harnad

Stevan Robert Harnad (Hernád István Róbert, Hesslein István; born 1945) is a Canadian cognitive scientist based in Montreal.

== Early life and education ==
Harnad was born in Budapest, Hungary. He did his undergraduate work at McGill University and his graduate work at Princeton University's Department of Psychology. Harnad completed his Master of Arts degree in Psychology from McGill University in 1969 and received his Doctor of Philosophy degree from Princeton University in 1992. He was awarded an honorary doctorate by University of Liège in 2013.

== Research ==
Harnad's research interests are in cognitive science, open access and animal sentience. He is currently professor of psychology at Université du Québec à Montréal (UQAM), McGill University, and professor emeritus of cognitive science at the University of Southampton. Elected external member of the Hungarian Academy of Sciences in 2001 (resigned in protest against the government of Viktor Orbán, 8 October 2016), he was Canada Research Chair in cognitive science 2001–2015. His research is on categorization, communication, cognition, and consciousness and he has written extensively on categorical perception, symbol grounding, origin of language, lateralization, the Turing test, distributed cognition, scientometrics, and consciousness, and lately, large language models. Harnad is a former student of Donald O. Hebb and Julian Jaynes.

== Research publishing and open access ==
In 1978, Harnad was the founder of Behavioral and Brain Sciences, of which he remained editor-in-chief until 2002. In addition, he founded Psycoloquy (an early electronic journal sponsored by the American Psychological Association), CogPrints (an electronic eprint archive in the cognitive sciences hosted by the University of Southampton), and the American Scientist Open Access Forum (since 1998; now the Global Open Access List, GOAL). Harnad, an active promoter of open access self-archiving and EPrints is currently Editor-in-Chief of the refereed journal Animal Sentience.

=== Scholarly skywriting ===
Scholarly skywriting, coined by Harnad around 1987, is the combination of multiple email and a topic threaded web archive such as a newsgroup, electronic mailing list, hypermail, netnews or Internet forum, linked and sortable by date, author, or subject-heading threads. The name derives from the idea that texts can be written in the "sky" (via multiple email and a web archive) for all to see ("skyreading") and all to add their own comments to ("skywriting"). Harnad suggested that it could be a kind of open peer review, a supplement to classical peer review, but not a substitute for it. What Harnad called student skywriting is scholarly skywriting done in a teaching/learning context.

== Political activism ==
Harnad is the author of a 2011 open letter signed by over 60 external members of the Hungarian Academy of Sciences addressed to the Academy's President, József Pálinkás, concerning the press and police harassment campaign against Hungarian philosophers who were critics of the current Hungarian ruling party, Fidesz, and its prime minister, Viktor Orbán. Harnad resigned from his external membership of the Hungarian Academy of Sciences on 8 October 2016 in protest against the increasingly "Illiberal democracy" of Viktor Orban.

== Animal welfare ==
Harnad is Editor-in-Chief of the refereed journal Animal Sentience launched in 2015 by the Institute of Science and Policy of The Humane Society of the United States. A vegan, Harnad is increasingly active in animal welfare, animal rights, and animal law.

== See also ==
- List of animal rights advocates
- "Subversive Proposal"
