= Ng'iya Township =

Township in Siaya County, Kenya

Coordinates: 0.0400°N 34.3716°E

- Village
- Interactive map of Ng'iya Township
- Country: Kenya
- County: Siaya

Ng'iya Township is located in the Siaya County of Western Kenya. It is home to the Ng'iya Girls High School.
