= Geneva Declaration =

The Geneva Declaration may refer to:

- The Declaration of Geneva (medicine)
- The Geneva Declaration on the Future of the World Intellectual Property Organization
- Declaration of the Rights of the Child
- The Geneva Declaration on Armed Violence and Development
- The Geneva Consensus Declaration on Promoting Women's Health and Strengthening the Family
- The Geneva Declaration of 9 November 1918 on establishment of a Yugoslav state
