= Mary Abukutsa-Onyango =

Kenyan agricultural scientist

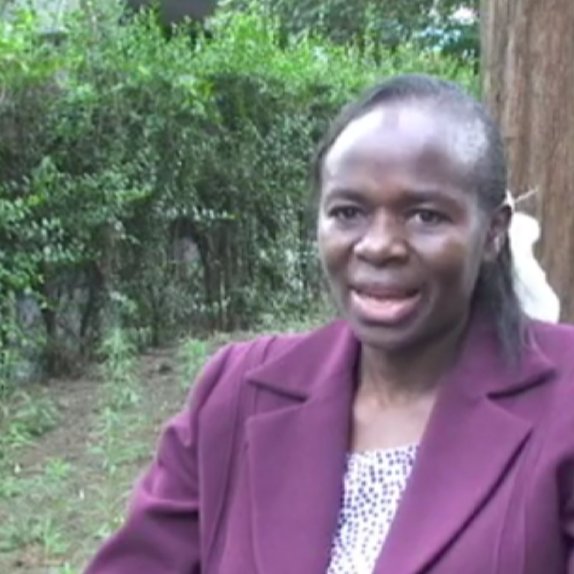
- Born: 20 February 1959 (age 67)
- Education: Ng’iya Girls High School, University of Nairobi and University of London
- Employer: Jomo Kenyatta University of Agriculture and Technology
- Known for: finding new "greens" to eat in Africa

Mary Oyiela Abukutsa-Onyango (born 20 February 1959) is a humanitarian and agricultural scientist from Kenya who specializes in olericulture, agronomy, plant physiology. Abukutsa-Onyango is a professor of horticulture at Jomo Kenyatta University of Agriculture and Technology whose work focuses on African indigenous food crops. Abukutsa Onyango has studied how African indigenous vegetables can be used to combat malnutrition in Africa while maintaining a secure form of revenue even during more challenging weather and climate.

== Early life and family ==
Mary Oyiela Abukutsa-Onyango was born on 20 February 1959 in Ematsuli, Kenya. She is the third born in a family of eight children to Enos Abukutsa Masele and Rosebella Amumbwe Abukutsa. She was baptized at Ilungu Seventh Day Adventist church in August 1975 by Pastor Washington Buka. While growing up in Kenya, Abukutsa-Onyango became ill due to an allergy to animal proteins, so her family cooked African vegetables that were abundant where she lived such as African nightshade, jute mallow, and the greens of cowpeas. One of her grandmothers cooked pumpkin leaves with peanut or sesame paste. Abukutsa-Onyango's father, Enos encouraged and supported his daughter becoming academic, and her mother Rosebella taught her to love and care. Abukutsa-Onyango married J.C. Onyango on 3 April 1987 and had two boys, Douglas Ochieng’ and Anthony Okelo.

== Education ==
Abukutsa-Onyango attended Ematsuli Primary School from 1966 to 1972 in Emuhya, Kenya. She later attended Bunyore Girls High School from 1973 to 1976 in Wekhomo, Kenya and Ng’iya Girls High School in 1977 in Ng’iya, Kenya. She obtained a Bachelors of Science in Agriculture in 1983 from the University of Nairobi. She received her Masters of Science in Agriculture in 1988 from the University of Nairobi. Finally, she received her Doctor of Philosophy in Olericulture, Plant Physiology and Nutrition in 1995 from Wye College, University of London.

== Career and works ==
Abukutsa-Onyango's interest and appreciation of indigenous African vegetables was sparked by an allergy to animal proteins she had as a child. This led her to pursue a career in agriculture as she wanted to “unravel the potential hidden in African indigenous vegetables,” she said. She has been involved in research of African indigenous vegetables since 1990 on an academic level and a practical level with farmers. She surveyed Kenya's indigenous plants to investigate the viability of seeds used by farmers. Her research has changed and she focuses on the nutritional properties of vegetables. Her research has shown that amaranth greens, spider plant, and African nightshade contain substantial amounts of protein and iron and are rich in calcium, folate, and vitamins A, C, and E. The cooking of these vegetables as studied by Abukutsa-Onyango could help combat malnutrition in Africa as they provide necessary nutrients and proteins to those who cannot afford meat.

Abukutsa-Onyango is a member of the African Women in Agricultural Research and Development (AWARD) team, a program created to increase the skilled women demographic supporting Africa's women farmers. With this profile, Abukutsa-Onyango has been able to influence Kenya's policy-makers. For example, the Health Ministry has advised hospitals to use African indigenous vegetables in HIV patients’ diets.

Abukutsa-Onyango has published over 20 peer-reviewed scientific articles and now teaches as a professor of horticulture at Jomo Kenyatta University of Agriculture and Technology in Juja, Kenya.

== Advocacy ==
Abukutsa-Onyango has advocated the consumption of African indigenous plants for over 20 years. She has led public education campaigns and worked with restaurants and supermarkets in order to find out how to incorporate these more nutritious, indigenous vegetables into the diets of the people. A significant problem was that people did not know how to cook the vegetables. Abukutsa-Onyango sought out the recipes lost by newer generations and tested them for nutritional value.

Abukutsa-Onyango believes that the African indigenous vegetables have significantly more nutritional value than exotic vegetables like cabbage and spinach. She advocates the return of these crops to address issues of nutrition, health, and poverty. In 2010 she also spoke about the difficulties of publishing her ideas and the importance of Open Access at the University of Nairobi Library arranged by Bioline International.

Abukutsa-Onyango has spoken at TED@Nairobi for the TED2013 Talent search. She gave evidence of the lack of vegetable consumption by Africans and plans for further commercialization and promotion of African indigenous vegetables. She briefly mentions the advantages of growing these vegetables such as their short growth period, adaptation to local climate, stress tolerance, and nutritional value.

== Awards and recognition ==
- Abukutsa-Onyango's research was showcased to US Secretary of State, Hillary Clinton on 5 August 2009 at NARL-KARI.
- She won first prize and RUFORUM trophy for a Young Professionals and Women Scientist Research Competition in Addis Ababa, Ethiopia and was recognized by the African Union.
- She received the CGIAR Science Award for Outstanding Communications by the Consultative Group in Agricultural Research (CGIAR) in 2007.
- She was awarded International Scientist of the year 2002 by the International Biographical Centre, Cambridge, England.
- She received the Edinburgh Medal in 2014 for dedication to finding sustainable solutions to obesity and malnutrition in Africa.
