= Information privilege =

Access to information inaccessible to others

Information privilege is the ability to access information others cannot; this usually includes the most credible, scholarly, and peer-reviewed information. The barriers to access include a person's geographical location, access to technology, access to education/higher education, status, financial situation, among other things. This creates a power dynamic where portions of a society benefit from having access to the highest quality information, those who benefit from selling/gatekeeping this information, and those who are marginalized by their lack of access to said information. Students attending higher education institutions with access to databases are advised to share that information while they have it since when they graduate, they lose access to it. The price for database access on average is over $1000/year for one database, which will prevent access for many. Open access is where scientists, journalists, and scholars in general are encouraged to publish their work on their platform so anybody with an internet connection can get access to it. This allows the scholar to publish their work elsewhere afterwards, so the scholar gets paid by a publisher and gets academic praise without restricting access to the public.

== National and international statements ==
Below is a list of national and international statements declaring access to information as a basic human right that should be upheld:

- United Nations Universal Declaration of Human Rights – Article 19 states that an individual has the right to hold their opinion and their opinion should be held "without interference and to seek, receive and impart information and ideas through any media and regardless of any frontiers".
- International Federation of Library Associations and Institutions' (IFLA) Beacons of the Information Society: The Alexandria Proclamation for Information Literacy and Lifelong Learning states information literacy is a "basic human right in a digital world" and advocates "institutions to meet technological, economic and social challenges, to redress disadvantage and to advance the well-being of all".
- The Presidential Committee on Information Literacy: Final Report from the Association of College and Research Libraries recognized the problems associated with lack of access to credible information. It states, "problems are more difficult to solve when people lack access to meaningful information vital to good decision making."
- The American Library Association Bill of Rights states "all libraries are forums for information and ideas" and in the published follow up, Interpretation of the Library Bill of Rights states, "Libraries and librarians protect and promote these rights by selecting, producing, providing access to, identifying, retrieving, organizing, providing instruction in the use of, and preserving recorded expression regardless of the format or technology."

== ACRL framework ==
The Association of College and Research Libraries developed the Framework for Information Literacy which is meant to guide the instruction of information literacy to college students. The ACRL Framework first mentions the term "information privilege" in the frame titled Information Has Value. It discusses the legal and socioeconomic circumstances that can influence the production of, and access to, information. It encourages learners to recognize their own information privilege and acknowledge that some individuals and groups are underrepresented especially in academic publishing. Some argue that the ACRL Framework does not go far enough to teach learners of information literacy about the social injustice issue of lack of access. It is advised that more explicit instructions be included on how learners can combat the injustice in access to information.

== Barriers to access ==
Researcher and educator Laura Saunders defines three barriers to access as physical, social, and cognitive/intellectual barriers. Physical barriers to access include not only geographical barriers but also access to the technology that will allow a person access to particular sources. As the internet became more popular and information became more readily available online, companies developed database subscription services that allowed individuals to access only the most reliable and well researched information. However access to this information was hidden behind a paywall where only a person with financial means or an affiliation with an education institution could have access. These paywalls still exist today. The notion of “reputable” information sources places value on information coming from certain news outlets or journals, but access to this knowledge is not open and people without financial liberty or educational privilege cannot access what information is seen as “quality” or “reputable”.

Saunders' idea of social barriers to access implies there is a barrier to information based on a cultural or socioeconomic circle of communication. Marginalized groups may not participate in a society they are distrusting of and therefore the information sources they trust may not be as vast or diverse. Access is limited because they only receive information from a small circle of people they trust. They may also not ask for help as readily as more privileged groups do. James Piccininni has stated that this social exclusion of groups of people in "social, economic, and political spheres" creates a power dynamic that dictates how information is created, distributed, and accessed. The third barrier to access is cognitive/intellectual access and ties in best with information literacy. Without learning the skills to locate, evaluate, and use information, a person may be susceptible to misinformation, propaganda, fake news, and general false statements, leaving them at a disadvantage and an inability to find reliable information. Looking within this barrier, it is important to ask where one can learn these skills. These skills are often taught in schools, but different circumstances may make it so that one has less access to quality education. This inequity in access if also often correlated with race and ethnicity, making it so that there are unique consequences regarding people belonging to marginalized groups. They not only live in a society that they are distrusting of where they do not feel comfortable looking outside of their group for resources and information, but they also live in a society that disallows them access to information because of structural barriers such as education and geography. Therefore, these people have less access to quality information for reasons that are out of their control, and the absence of that access makes it so that there are real-life, tangible consequences. People who do not have intellectual access to information may fall victim to propaganda rooted in false information or things alike. The lack of access makes them more likely to be victims instead of critically engaging with information and content that exists in online spaces. An advantage to providing access to information within a community is that it allows the voices of the most brilliant within a demographic to be heard when they might otherwise have been discounted or marginalized.

== Open access ==
Much of the most reliable and current information in a particular field is found behind a paywall where only persons associated with an educational institution or professional organization, or the monetary means to purchase journal subscriptions has access to this information. The inherent issues of academic publishing created a growing advocacy for the open access movement.

== See also ==
- Access to Knowledge movement
