= Leslie Chan =

Hong Kong-born Canadian open access advocate

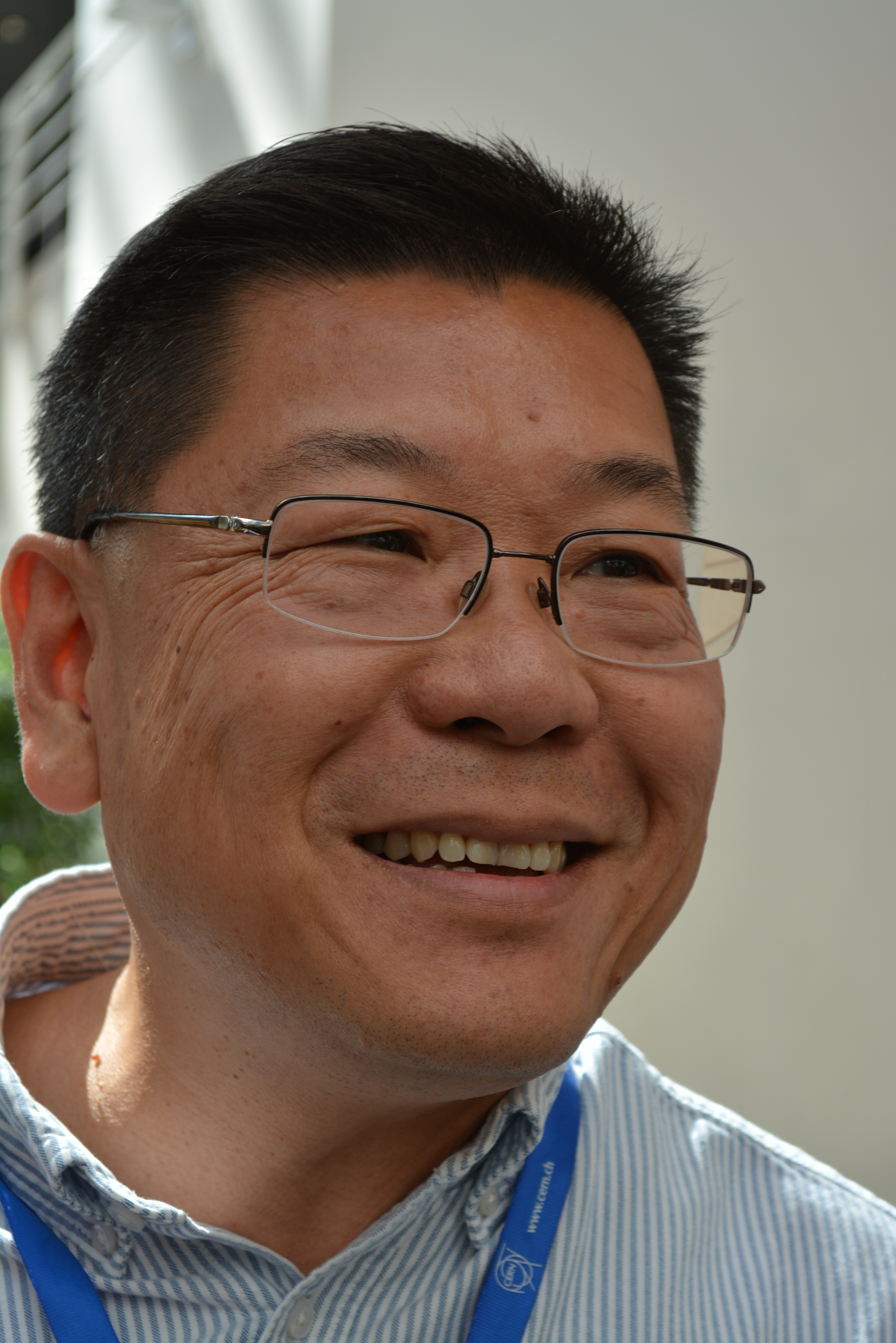
Leslie Chan in 2013

Leslie Chan is an advocate for open access. He is a professor at University of Toronto Scarborough.

== Biography ==
Chan was born in Hong Kong in 1959. When he was 16 he moved to Canada to attend university. He received a degree in anthropology. While working to have his research published, he began to perceive problems with academic publishing and began exploring options to fix them.

== Work ==
Chan supports the open access movement.

Chan was a signatory to the Budapest Open Access Initiative.

== Bioline International ==
In 1993 Chan founded Bioline International. Bioline International is a not-for-profit scholarly publishing cooperative which seeks to share open access journals published in developing countries. Chan believes that developing countries need access to journals.
