= Durham Statement on Open Access to Legal Scholarship =

The Durham Statement on Open Access to Legal Scholarship is a public statement related to ensuring the open access of legal information and scholarship. It was written in 2008 by a group of library directors from law schools in the United States.

== Background and development ==
In 2007, Richard Danner presented two different papers arguing that John Willinsky's open access principles were also applicable to legal scholarship and information. He also presented information on the work Duke University School of Law had done to improve electronic access to journals and faculty scholarship. In October 2008, Danner met with library directors from 11 other law schools at Duke's campus in Durham, North Carolina to discuss the topic. The resulting statement issued by the group called for all law schools to stop publishing their law journals in print format and to rely instead on open access electronic publication coupled with a commitment to keep the electronic versions available in stable, open, digital formats.

An important motivation underlying this call was not only improving access, but also that "very few law journals receive enough in subscription income and royalties to cover their costs of operation."

== Response and legacy ==
In a discussion of the Durham Statement published two years after it was issued, Danner noted that "[the] call to end print publication of law reviews was more controversial than that regarding open access." Law librarians have raised questions about the ability to effectively digitally preserve materials and whether the "stable, open, digital formats" the statement suggests are more of an ideal than an attainable goal.
