= István Rév =

Budapest professor

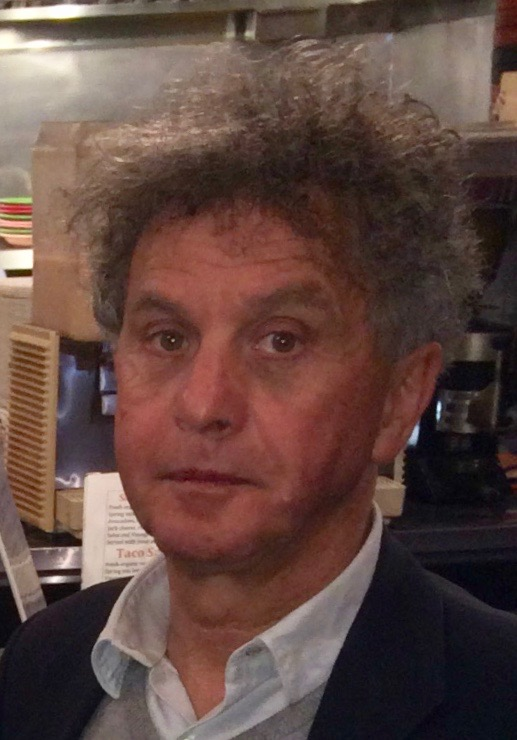
István Rév (2017)

István Rév (Budapest, 17 January 1951) is professor of history and political science at Central European University in Budapest and director of the Vera and Donald Blinken Open Society Archives. He is member of the Open Society Foundations Global Board.

== Life course ==
Rév got his degree of history, sociology and English literature at Eötvös Loránd University, Budapest in 1975. He was research associate at the Department of the History of Economics of the Karl Marx Economic University, Budapest. (1975–91). He was director of the University of California Central European Studies Program in Budapest (1982–90). He was a founding member of the Danube Circle in 1984, a clandestine militant group for preventing the construction of the water dam in the Danube bend, for which the group was given in 1985 the Right for Livelihood award of the Swedish Parliament. In 1985–1986 he was fellow at the School of Social Science, Institute for Advanced Study, Princeton. In 1989 he was a founding member of the editorial board of Budapest Review of Books. In 1991–1993 he was director of the Budapest College of Central European University (CEU), founded by George Soros. He has been professor of history at CEU since then. In 1994 he was invited to the Doreen B. Townsend Center for the Humanities, Berkeley; Center for Advanced Study, University of Michigan, Ann Arbor, in 1995 to the Getty Center in Santa Monica, in 1997–98 he was fellow at the Center for Advanced Studies in the Behavioral Sciences at Stanford. In 1995, he was the recipient of the New Europe Prize. In 1998 he became director of the Blinken Open Society Archives. He has served several times as visiting professor at the History Department of the University of California, Berkeley.

== Scholarly interests ==
Rév's scholarly interests include economic history, historical amnesia, memory, historical anthropology, history of the cult of the dead, show-trials of the 20th century.

== Selected publications ==
- Local Autonomy or Centralism: When was the Original Sin Committed, International journal of urban and regional research, 8 (1984):38–63.
- The Advantages of Being Atomized. How Hungarians Coped with Collectivization, Dissent, 34(1987): 335–50.
- In mendacio veritas (In Lies there Lies the Truth), Representations No. 35 (1991), 1–20.
- The Postmortem Victory of Communism, Daedalus. 123 (1994):159-70.
- Parallel Autopsies, Representations No. 49 (1995):15–39.
- The Necronym, Representations. No. 64 (1998): 76–107.
- Retrotopia: Critical Reason Turns Primitive, Current sociology. 46 (1998): 51–80.
- Counter-revolution BOOKS – Budapest Review of Books. 9 (1999): 128–37.
- The Self-not-fulfilling Prophecy, in Ralf Dahrendorf et al. (eds.), The Paradoxes of Unintended Consequences, Budapest: CEU Press, 2000, 285–300.
- Counterrevolution, in Sorin Antohi – Vladimir Tismaneanu (eds.), Between Past and Future: The Revolutions of 1989 and Their Aftermath. Budapest: CEU Press, 2000. 247-71.
- The Suggestion, Representations. No. 80 (2002): 62–98.
- Retroactive Justice: Prehistory of Post-Communism (Stanford, CA: Stanford University Press, 2005).
- The Man in White Raincoat, in Oksana Sarkisova – Péter Apor (eds.), Past for the Eyes: East European Representations of Communism in Cinema and Museums after 1989. Budapest: CEU Press; 2008, 3–56.
- The Terror of the House, in R. Ostrow (ed.), (Re)visualizing National History: Museums and National Identities in Europe in the New Millennium. Toronto: University of Toronto Press, 2008. 47–89.
