= Budapest Open Access Initiative =

2002 statement on open access to research literature

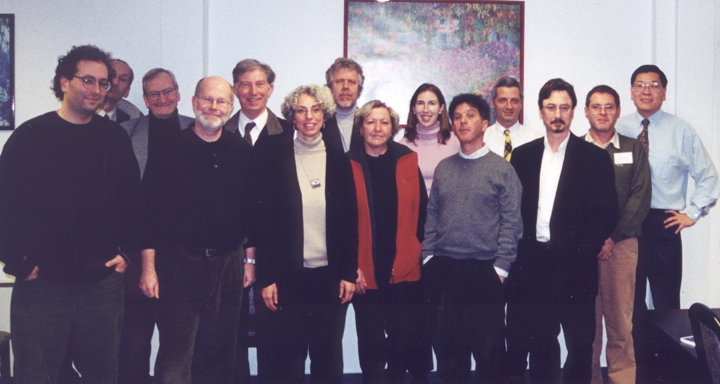
Participants at meeting in Budapest, December 1, 2001

The Budapest Open Access Initiative (BOAI) is a public statement of principles relating to open access to the research literature, which was released to the public on February 14, 2002. It arose from a convening in Budapest organized by the Open Society Institute on December 1–2, 2001 to promote open access, which at that time was also known as Free Online Scholarship. This small gathering of individuals is recognized as one of the major defining events of the open access movement.

== Content ==
The opening sentence of the BOAI encapsulated the purpose and potential of an open access movement:

An old tradition and a new technology have converged to make possible an unprecedented public good. The old tradition is the willingness of scientists and scholars to publish the fruits of their research in scholarly journals without payment, for the sake of inquiry and knowledge. The new technology is the internet. The public good they make possible is the world-wide electronic distribution of the peer-reviewed journal literature and completely free and unrestricted access to it by all scientists, scholars, teachers, students, and other curious minds.

— Budapest Open Access Initiative

=== Definition ===
The document contains one of the first and most widely used definitions of open access, which was subsequently reaffirmed, 10 years after it was first published:

By "open access" to this literature, we mean its free availability on the public internet, permitting any users to read, download, copy, distribute, print, search, or link to the full texts of these articles, crawl them for indexing, pass them as data to software, or use them for any other lawful purpose, without financial, legal, or technical barriers other than those inseparable from gaining access to the internet itself. The only constraint on reproduction and distribution, and the only role for copyright in this domain, should be to give authors control over the integrity of their work and the right to be properly acknowledged and cited.

=== Strategy and funding ===
In 2001, the BOAI recommended two complementary strategies in order to achieve open access to scientific literature. First, scholars should follow the practice of self-archiving which is when authors deposit a copy of their own text to open archives on the internet. Preferably these archives should conform to the standards of the Open Archives Initiative and make it easy for users to find the texts. Second, scholars should launch new online open access journals and help other periodicals to adapt the principles of open access.

=== 10th anniversary update ===
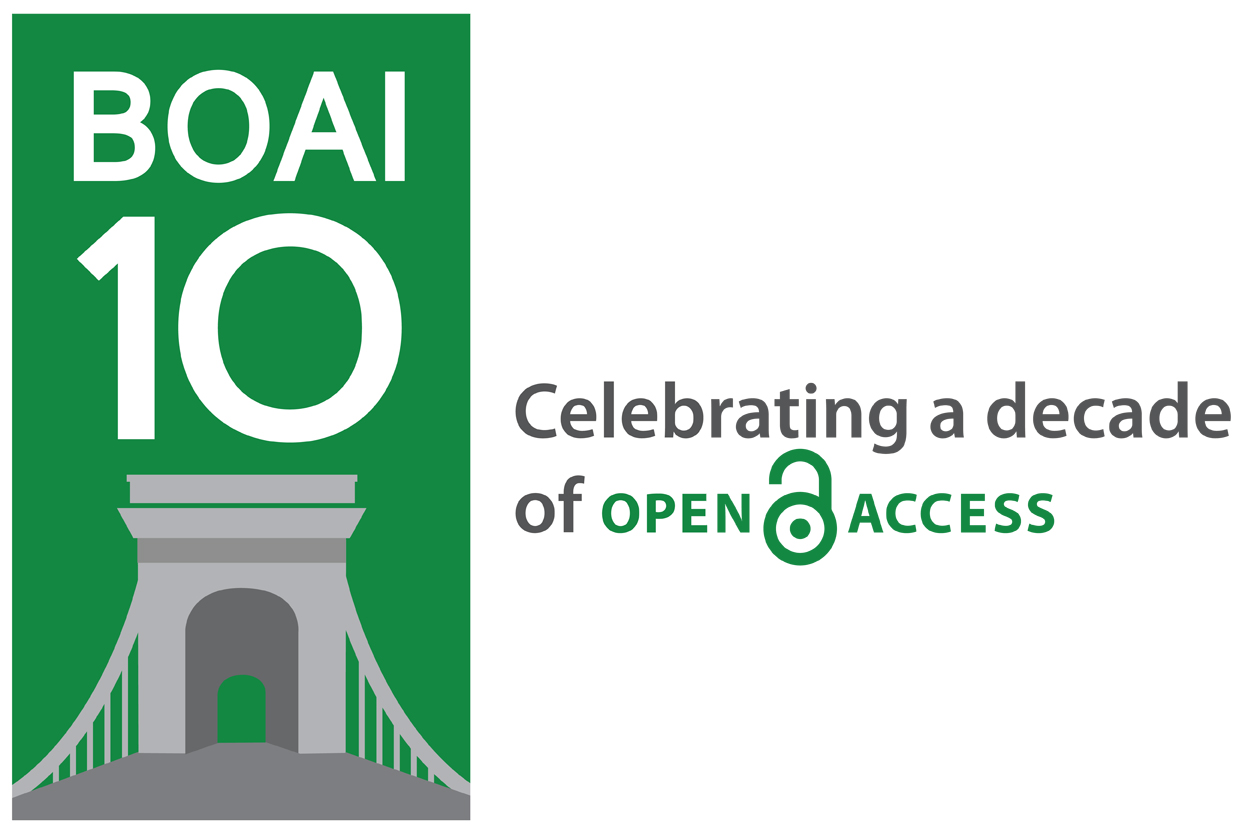
A logo celebrating the 10th anniversary of the Budapest Open Access Initiative in 2012, featuring the Széchenyi Chain Bridge in Budapest.

In 2012 on the 10th anniversary of the original initiative, a new statement was released which reaffirmed the BOAI's definition of open access, its goals, strategies and commitment to make progress. It also contained "the new goal that within the next ten years, OA will become the default method for distributing new peer-reviewed research in every field and country", policy recommendations for universities, research funding agencies, recommendations on choosing the optimal licence (CC-BY), designing open access repository infrastructure, and advocacy for achieving open access.

As of 2021, the text of the initiative had been translated to 13 languages.

=== 20th anniversary recommendations ===
In recognition of the 20th anniversary of the original declaration, the BOAI2020 Steering Committee released four high-level recommendations alongside a set of subrecommendations.

== Impact ==
Along with the 2003 Berlin Declaration on Open Access to Knowledge in the Sciences and Humanities and 2003 Bethesda Statement on Open Access Publishing, the Budapest initiative defined open access to research, lay out strategies for achieving this, and began the "open access movement" or "social movement" phase of open access advocacy.

The initiative was sponsored with a US $3 million grant from the Open Society Institute.

== Signatories ==
The 16 original signatories of the Budapest Open Access Initiative included prominent early advocates for open access:

- Leslie Chan of Bioline International
- Darius Cuplinskas, Melissa Hagemann, Rima Kupryte of Open Society Institute
- István Rév, Open Society Institute, Open Society Archives
- Michael Eisen of the Public Library of Science
- Fred Friend († April 23, 2014) of University College London
- Yana Genova of the Next Page Foundation
- Jean-Claude Guédon of the Université de Montréal
- Stevan Harnad of the University of Southampton/Université du Québec à Montréal
- Rick Johnson of the Scholarly Publishing and Academic Resources Coalition (SPARC)
- Manfredi La Manna of the Electronic Society for Social Scientists
- Monika Segbert, Electronic Information for Libraries (EIFL) Project consultant
- Sidnei de Souza, Informatics Director at CRIA, Bioline International
- Peter Suber, Professor of Philosophy, Earlham College and The Free Online Scholarship Newsletter
- Jan Velterop of BioMed Central

In February 2002, the signatories released BOAI in a version that could be signed by the public. As of February 2016, over 5,900 individuals and 800 organizations had signed it. By 2023, this was over 6800 individuals and 1600 organizations.

== See also ==
- Berlin Declaration on Open Access to Knowledge in the Sciences and Humanities
- Bethesda Statement on Open Access Publishing
- Cape Town Open Education Declaration
- Open Access Week
