= Global Open Access Forum =

Online discussion forum

The Global Open Access List (GOAL), until January 2012 the American Scientist Open Access Forum, is the longest-standing online discussion forum on Open Access (free online access to peer-reviewed research). It was created by the American Scientist, which is published by Sigma Xi, in September 1998, before the term "Open Access" (OA) was coined, and it was originally called the "September98-Forum." Its first focus was an article published in American Scientist in which Thomas J Walker of the University of Florida proposed that journals should furnish free online access out of the fees authors pay them to purchase reprints. Stevan Harnad, who had in 1994 made the Subversive Proposal that all researchers should self archive their peer-reviewed research, was invited to moderate the forum, which was not expected to last more than a few months. It continued to grow in size and influence across the years and is still the site where most of the main developments in OA are first mooted, including self-archiving, institutional repositories, citation impact, research performance metrics, publishing reform, copyright reform, open access journals, and open access mandates.
