= Psycoloquy =

- Discipline: Cognitive science
- Language: English
- Edited by: Stevan Harnad

Publication details
- History: 1990–2002
- Publisher: American Psychological Association
- Open access: Yes

Standard abbreviations
- ISO 4: Psycoloquy

Indexing
- ISSN: 1055-0143

Links
- Journal homepage

Psycoloquy was a refereed interdisciplinary open access journal that was published from 1990 to 2002 and was sponsored by the American Psychological Association (APA) and indexed by APA's PsycINFO and the Institute for Scientific Information. The editor-in-chief was Stevan Harnad. A 1995 book on electronic publishing resulted from a listserv discussion about an article published in Psycoloquy.

Psycoloquy published articles and Open Peer Commentary in all areas of psychology as well as cognitive science, neuroscience, behavioral biology, artificial intelligence, robotics/vision, linguistics, and philosophy. Psycoloquy was suspended in 2002, and is now defunct.
