= Bioline International =

- Status: Active
- Founded: 1993
- Founders: Barbara Kirsop, Brian Kirsop, Vanderlei Canhos
- Country of origin: Canada
- Headquarters location: Toronto
- Distribution: Worldwide
- Publication types: Scientific journals
- Nonfiction topics: Bioscience, biology, medicine, health
- Official website: bioline.org.br

Bioline International is a non-profit cooperative that operates an online platform for sharing works by peer-reviewed open access bioscience journals published in developing countries in Africa, Asia, and South America. This includes meta data, abstracts, and individual articles in pdf and HTML (when available). Bioline is an international collaboration between the University of Toronto Libraries as stewards, the Reference Center on Environmental Information in Brazil for technical infrastructure, and Bioline UK as a liaison. It was founded by Leslie Chan.

In 2010 Prof. Mary Abukutsa-Onyango spoke about the difficulties of publishing her ideas about Africa's vegetables and fruits. She noted the importance of Open Access at an event at the University of Nairobi Library.
