= CogPrints =

CogPrints is an electronic archive in which authors can self-archive papers in any area of cognitive science, including psychology, neuroscience, and linguistics, and many areas of computer science (e.g., artificial intelligence, robotics, vision, learning, speech, neural networks), philosophy (e.g., mind, language, knowledge, science, logic), biology (e.g., ethology, behavioral ecology, sociobiology, behaviour genetics, evolutionary theory), medicine (e.g., psychiatry, neurology, human genetics, imaging), anthropology (e.g., primatology, cognitive ethnology, archeology, paleontology), as well as any other portions of the physical, social and mathematical sciences that are pertinent to the study of cognition.

CogPrints is moderated by Stevan Harnad. The archive was launched in 1997 and now contains over 2000 freely downloadable articles.

Some cite CogPrints, along with the physics archive arXiv as evidence that the author self-archiving model of Open Access can work—although under the influence of the Open Archives Initiative and its OAI-PMH, the emphasis in self-archiving has since moved away from such central repositories in the direction of distributed self-archiving in Institutional Repositories. CogPrints was first made OAI-compliant, and then the software was converted into the EPrints software at the University of Southampton by Rob Tansley who then went on to design DSpace. EPrints is now maintained by Christopher Gutteridge at Southampton.

== See also ==
- List of academic databases and search engines
- List of preprint repositories
