= Berlin Declaration on Open Access to Knowledge in the Sciences and Humanities =

Statement on Open Access to knowledge

The Berlin Declaration on Open Access to Knowledge in the Sciences and Humanities is an international statement on open access and access to knowledge. It emerged from a conference on open access hosted in the Harnack House in Berlin by the Max Planck Society in 2003.

== Background ==
Following the Budapest Open Access Initiative in 2002 and the Bethesda Statement on Open Access Publishing in 2003, the Berlin Declaration was a third influential event in the establishment of the open access movement. Peter Suber has referred to the three events combined as the "BBB definition" of open access as the three overlap with and inform one another.

The declaration was drafted at an October 2003 conference held by the Max Planck Society and the European Cultural Heritage Online (ECHO) project. More than 120 cultural and political organizations from around the world attended.

== Statement ==
The statement itself was published on October 22, 2003. Acknowledging the increasing importance of the internet and the previous discussions on the need for open access, it offered the following definition of an open access contribution:

Open access contributions must satisfy two conditions: The author(s) and right holder(s) of such contributions grant(s) to all users a free, irrevocable, worldwide, right of access to, and a license to copy, use, distribute, transmit and display the work publicly and to make and distribute derivative works, in any digital medium for any responsible purpose, subject to proper attribution of authorship (community standards, will continue to provide the mechanism for enforcement of proper attribution and responsible use of the published work, as they do now), as well as the right to make small numbers of printed copies for their personal use.

A complete version of the work and all supplemental materials, including a copy of the permission as stated above, in an appropriate standard electronic format is deposited (and thus published) in at least one online repository using suitable technical standards (such as the Open Archive definitions) that is supported and maintained by an academic institution, scholarly society, government agency, or other well-established organization that seeks to enable open access, unrestricted distribution, inter operability, and long-term archiving.

It also encouraged researchers and institutions to publish their work in accordance with these principles, advocate for open access and help in the development and assessment of open access related tools and measures.

== Signatories ==
As of March 2026, there are 828 signatories of the declaration. Max Planck Society and Helmholtz Association were among the first signatories. Signatories include governments, universities, research institutions, funding agencies, foundations, libraries, museums, archives, learned societies and professional associations.

== Legacy ==
At a 2005 follow-up conference, the declaration was refined to two key principles: signatories should require researchers to deposit a copy of their work in an open access repository and encourage the publication of work in open access journals when available. Today these two concepts are often called "green OA" and "gold OA", respectively, and the two combined are referred to as an open-access mandate.

In 2013, on the 10th anniversary of the declaration, a mission statement was published with a goal of ensuring that 90% of research is published within an open access model.

== See also ==
- Open access around the world:
  - Africa: South Africa
  - Americas: Canada
  - Asia: India
  - Europe: Austria, Belgium, Denmark, France, Germany, Greece, Hungary, Ireland, Italy, Netherlands, Norway, Poland, Portugal, Russia, Spain, Sweden, Ukraine
- Plan S — a European open access science publishing initiative launched in late‑2018
