= Richard Danner =

American scholar

Richard A. Danner (August 26, 1947 – February 22, 2018) was an American legal scholar, the Archibald C. and Frances Fulk Rufty Research Professor of Law Emeritus at Duke University School of Law in Durham, North Carolina. He held the position of Senior Associate Dean for Information Services and served in various capacities at Duke, starting in 1979, and was appointed Director of the Duke University Law Library in 1981. Prior to working at Duke, Richard Danner served as a law librarian at the University of Wisconsin–Madison, where he received degrees in law and library science.

Danner has served as the American Association of Law Libraries president, is a member of the American Bar Association, has served on the Executive Committee of the Association of American Law Schools and as the First Vice President of the International Association of Law Libraries.

Danner is co-author, with John Palfrey of the Durham Statement on Open Access to Legal Scholarship of 2008, which advocates for the open access publishing of law journals. Danner has been an outspoken supporter of open access in law.

== Publications ==
Richard Danner has published extensively on law librarianship, legal information, information technology and the law, and legal research. He has edited Toward a Renaissance in Law Librarianship (1997), Introduction to Foreign Legal Systems (with Marie- Louise Bernal) (1994), and Legal Information and the Development of American Law (with Frank G. Houdek) (2008). His books include Legal Research in Wisconsin (1980) and Strategic Planning: A Law Library Management Tool for the '90s and Beyond (1997 2nd edition). In addition to his books, Professor Danner has published in a number of journals including in The Journal of Legal Education, The Law Librarian, the Michigan Law Review, the International Journal of Legal Information, and Law Library Journal. He has also served as the Editor of Law Library Journal.
