= Peter D. Eimas =

Peter D. Eimas (1934 – October 28, 2005) was an expert in psychology and cognitive sciences and a professor at Brown University. His seminal paper showed that infants have greater linguistic and cognitive abilities than previously thought. Eimas was born in Bridgeport, Connecticut. He died in Providence, Rhode Island. The "Peter D. Eimas Graduate Fund" was established in his honor at Brown University to help graduate students studying psychological or the cognitive sciences. In one of his studies he observed that infants at the age of one month recognise change in language and can distinguish between "bah" and "pah".
