= Geneva Declaration on the Future of the World Intellectual Property Organization =

2004 document regarding intellectual property legislation

The Geneva Declaration on the Future of the World Intellectual Property Organization is a document signed in 2004 by a number of non-profit organizations, scientists, academics and other individuals urging the World Intellectual Property Organization (WIPO) to focus on the needs of developing countries with respect to intellectual property legislation.

The authors and signatories believe that the "world is facing a crisis in the governance of knowledge, technology, and culture", in particular due to unequal access to vital medicines and education, anticompetitive economic practices, concentration of ownership, technological measures such as digital rights management (DRM), the fair compensation of authors and creators, and the locking up of the public domain by private interests.

The Declaration criticises WIPO for embracing "a culture of creating and expanding monopoly privileges, often without regard to consequences", and calls for the organization to shift its focus from intellectual property as an end in and of itself, to a means for benefiting humanity. In particular, it calls for a moratorium on the now-common practice of harmonizing intellectual property legislation throughout the developing world to the laws as they exist in the United States and Europe.

In 2009 this resulted into the WIPO Development Agenda, which incorporated some of the proposals.
