= Peter Suber =

American philosopher and open access advocate

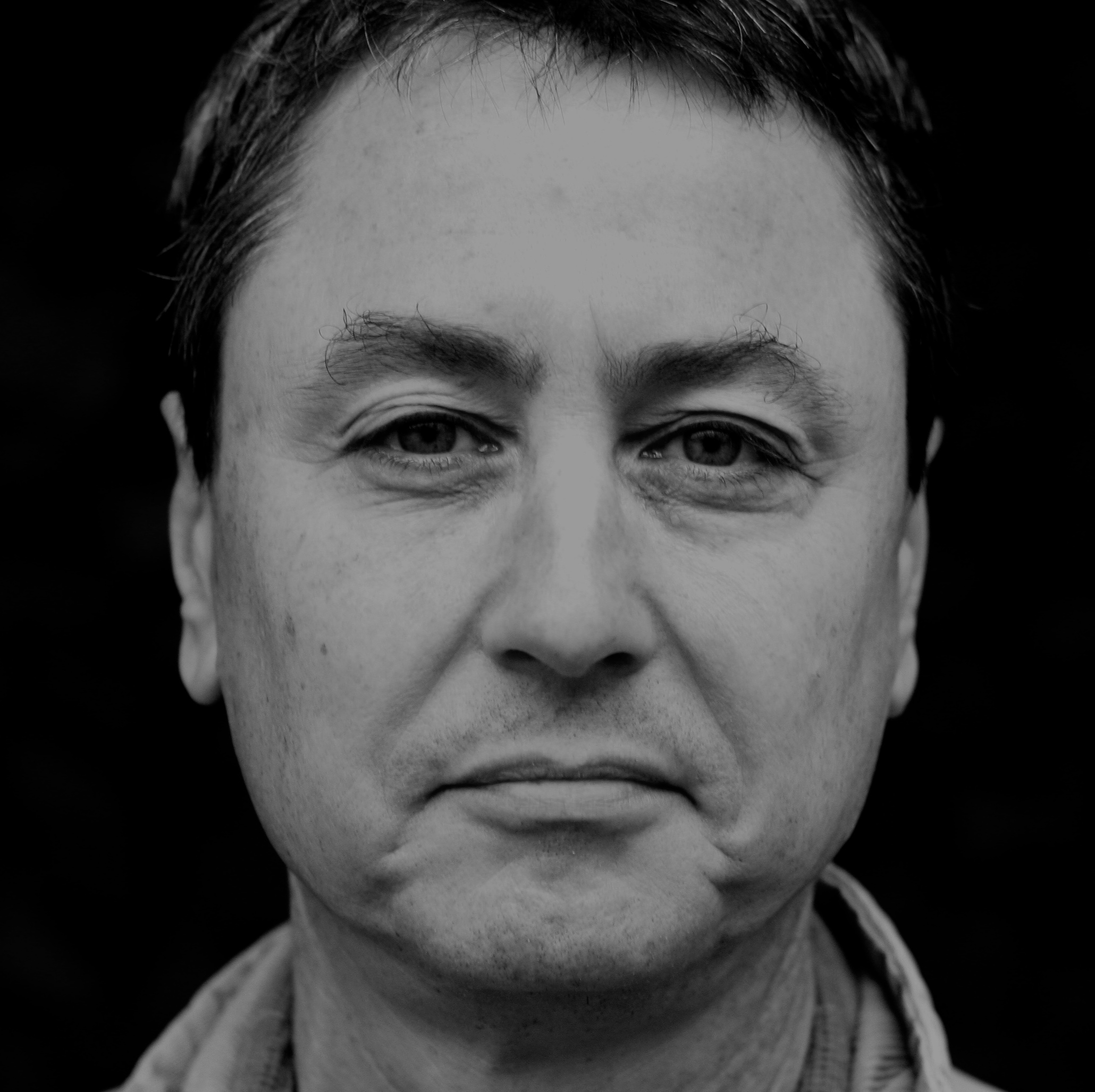
- Suber in 2009
- Born: November 8, 1951 (age 74); Evanston, Illinois, U.S.
- Education: Earlham College (BA); Northwestern University (MA, PhD, JD)
- Known for: Nomic; Open access Budapest Open Access Initiative
- Spouse: Liffey Thorpe
- Awards: Lyman Ray Patterson Copyright Award (2011)
- Scientific career
- Fields: Open access Philosophy; Ethics; Logic
- Workplaces: Northwestern University; Earlham College; Harvard University; Scholarly Publishing and Academic Resources Coalition; Berkman Klein Center for Internet & Society; Wikimedia Foundation; Open Knowledge Foundation; Public Knowledge
- Thesis: Kierkegaard's Concept of Irony especially in relation to Freedom, Personality and Dialectic (1978)
- Doctoral advisor: William A. Earle
- Website: cyber.law.harvard.edu/~psuber/wiki/Peter_Suber legacy.earlham.edu/~peters/hometoc.htm cyber.law.harvard.edu/people/psuber

Peter Dain Suber (born November 8, 1951) is an American philosopher specializing in the philosophy of law and open access to knowledge. He is a Senior Researcher at the Berkman Klein Center for Internet & Society, Director of the Harvard Office for Scholarly Communication, and Director of the Harvard Open Access Project (HOAP). Suber is known as a leading voice in the open access movement, and as the creator of the game Nomic.

== Education ==
Suber graduated from Earlham College in 1973, received a PhD degree in philosophy in 1978, writing a dissertation on Søren Kierkegaard and a Juris Doctor degree in 1982, both from Northwestern University.

== Career ==
Previously, Suber was senior research professor of philosophy at Earlham College, the open access project director at Public Knowledge, a senior researcher at Scholarly Publishing and Academic Resources Coalition (SPARC). He is a member of the Board of Enabling Open Scholarship, the Advisory Boards at the Wikimedia Foundation, the Open Knowledge Foundation, and the advisory boards of other organizations devoted to open access and an information commons.

Suber worked as a stand-up comic from 1976 to 1981, including an appearance on The Tonight Show Starring Johnny Carson in 1976. Suber returned to Earlham College as a professor from 1982 to 2003 where he taught classes on philosophy, law, logic, and Kant's Critique of Pure Reason, among other topics. In 1997, he launched Hippias (later Noesis), a peer-reviewed search engine for the field of philosophy.

Suber participated in the 2001 meeting that led to the world's first major international open access initiative, the Budapest Open Access Initiative. He wrote Open Access News and the SPARC Open Access Newsletter, considered the most authoritative blog and newsletter on open access. He is also the founder of the Open Access Tracking Project, and co-founder, with Robin Peek, of the Open Access Directory.

In philosophy, Suber is the author of The Paradox of Self-Amendment, the first book-length study of self-referential paradoxes in law, and The Case of the Speluncean Explorers: Nine New Opinions, the first book-length "rehearing" of Lon Fuller's classic, fictional case. He has also written many articles on self-reference, ethics, formal and informal logic, the philosophy of law, and the history of philosophy.

He has written many articles on open access to science and scholarship. His 2012 book, Open Access, was published by MIT Press and released under a Creative Commons license. His latest book is a collection of 44 of his most influential articles about open access, Knowledge Unbound: Selected Writings on Open Access, 2002–2010, also published by MIT Press under a Creative Commons license.

Suber has directed the development of TagTeam since its start in 2011. TagTeam is an open-source, social-tagging platform developed for the Harvard Open Access Project at the Berkman Klein Center for Internet & Society at Harvard University.

== Honours and awards ==
Lingua Franca magazine named Suber one of Academia's 20 Most Wired Faculty in 1999. Readers of The Charleston Advisor gave him a special Readers' Choice Award in October 2006, "Non-Librarian Working for Our Cause." The American Library Association named him the winner of the Lyman Ray Patterson Copyright Award for 2011. Choice named his book on Open Access "an Outstanding Academic Title for 2013."

Peter Suber at the 10th anniversary meeting of the Budapest Open Access Initiative in February 2012.

== Personal life ==
Suber is married to Liffey Thorpe, professor emerita of Classics at Earlham College, with whom he has two daughters. Since 2003, he and Thorpe have resided in Brooksville, Maine.

His mother was Grace Mary Stern, who served in both houses of the Illinois state legislature.

== Selected publications ==
- Knowledge Unbound (MIT Press, 2016) (Note: Knowledge Unbound was released for free under the Creative Commons license, (See: Wikipedia:Text of Creative Commons Attribution-ShareAlike 3.0 Unported License) and may be downloaded for free from the Internet Archive.)
- Suber, Peter (20 July 2012), Open Access, MIT Press, OL 16167984W, Wikidata Q54410433 Updates and supplements.
- The Case of the Speluncean Explorers: Nine New Opinions (Routledge, 1998)
- The Paradox of Self-Amendment: A Study of Logic, Law, Omnipotence, and Change (Peter Lang Publishing, 1990)
- Self-Reference: Reflections on Reflexivity, co-edited with Steven J. Bartlett (Martinus Nijhoff, 1987)
