= Bethesda Statement on Open Access Publishing =

The Bethesda Statement on Open Access Publishing is a 2003 statement which defines the concept of open access and then supports that concept.

== Statement ==
On 11 April 2003, the Howard Hughes Medical Institute held a meeting for 24 people to discuss better access to scholarly literature. The group made a definition of an open access publication as one which grants a "free, irrevocable, worldwide, perpetual right of access to, and a license to copy, use, distribute, transmit, and display the work publicly and to make and distribute derivative works, in any digital medium for any responsible purpose, subject to proper attribution of authorship" and from which every article is "deposited immediately upon initial publication in at least one online repository".

== Significance ==
Along with the Budapest Open Access Initiative (BOAI) and the Berlin Declaration on Open Access to Knowledge in the Sciences and Humanities, the Bethesda Statement established "open access" as the term to describe initiatives to make research more widely and easily available.

The Bethesda Statement builds on the BOAI by saying how users will enact open access. Specifically, open access practitioners will put content online with a license granting rights for reuse including the right to make derivative works. The BOAI does not mention derivative works.
