= Open science =

Open scientific research

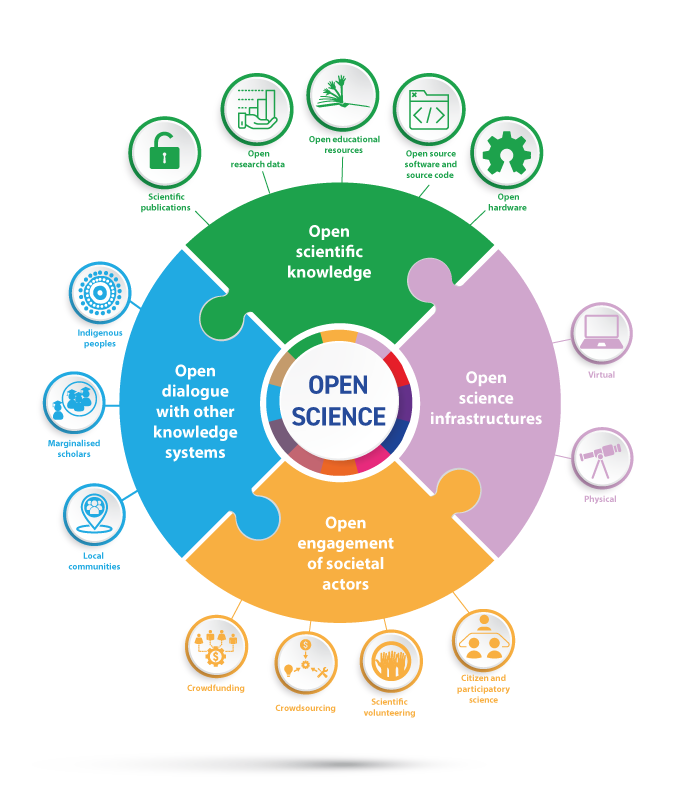
- Pillars of open science according to UNESCO's 2021 recommendation
- Country: Worldwide
- Major figures: UNESCO
- Influences: Open access, Open source movement, Creative Commons licenses, Sci-Hub, Wikimedia movement.
- Influenced: Academia worldwide

Open science (also known as open research) is the movement to make scientific research, including publications, data, physical samples, software, and models, transparent and accessible to all levels of society through collaborative networks. This encompasses practices such as publishing open research, campaigning for open access, encouraging scientists to practice open-notebook science (such as openly sharing data and code and now open hardware to enable replication of physical experiments), broader dissemination and public engagement in science, and generally making it easier to publish, access, and communicate scientific knowledge.

Usage of the term varies substantially across disciplines, with a notable prevalence in the STEM disciplines. The term 'open research' has gained currency as a broader alternative to 'open science,' encompassing the humanities and arts alongside traditional scientific disciplines. The primary focus connecting all disciplines is the widespread uptake of new technologies and tools, and the underlying ecology of the production, dissemination and reception of knowledge from a research-based point-of-view. The term 'open scholarship' has also been proposed to include research from the arts and humanities as well as the different roles and practices that researchers perform as educators and communicators.

Open science can be seen as continuing, rather than revolutionizing, practices that began in the 17th century with the academic journal, which enabled scientists to share resources in response to growing societal demand for scientific knowledge. The Open Science movement emerged primarily from tensions within science between professional ethical codes prescribing transparency and collaborativeness on the one hand and competitive pressures leading to a focus on research article output and the exclusive handling of research on the other. Institutional interests to protect proprietary information for profit added to the latter.

== Principles ==
Open science elements based on UNESCO presentation of 17 February 2021. This depiction includes indigenous science.

The principles of open science are:

- Open methodology
- Open source
- Open data
- Open access
- Open peer review
- Open educational resources
- Open hardware

== Background ==
The scientific research process is characterized by a series of activities, including the collection, analysis, publication, re-analysis, critique, and reuse of data. A number of barriers have been identified by proponents of open science that impede or dissuade the broad dissemination of scientific data. These include financial paywalls of for-profit research publishers, restrictions on usage applied by publishers of data, poor formatting of data or use of proprietary software that makes it difficult to re-purpose, and cultural reluctance to publish data for fears of losing control of how the information is used.

According to the FOSTER taxonomy, open science can often include aspects of open access, open data, and the open-source movement. However, modern scientific research requires software for data and information processing. Additionally, open research computation addresses the problem of reproducibility of scientific results.

=== Types ===
The term 'open science' lacks a single standardized definition or measurement framework. On the one hand, it has been referred to as a "puzzling phenomenon". On the other hand, the term has been used to encapsulate a series of principles that aim to foster scientific growth and its complementary access to the public. Sociologists Benedikt Fecher and Sascha Friesike have categorized Open Science into five schools of thought, each emphasizing different aspects of the movement.

According to Fecher and Friesike 'Open Science' encompasses diverse perspectives on how knowledge is created and shared. Fecher and Friesike identify five distinct schools of Open Science, each reflecting different priorities and approaches to the movement:

==== Infrastructure School ====
The infrastructure school views efficient research as dependent on openly available platforms, tools, and applications. It regards open science primarily as a technological challenge, focusing on internet-based infrastructure including software, applications, and computing networks. The infrastructure school is tied closely with the notion of "cyberscience", which describes the trend of applying information and communication technologies to scientific research, which has led to an amicable development of the infrastructure school. Specific elements of this prosperity include increasing collaboration and interaction between scientists, as well as the development of "open-source science" practices. The sociologists discuss two central trends in the infrastructure school:

1. Distributed computing: This trend encapsulates practices that outsource complex, process-heavy scientific computing to a network of volunteer computers around the world. The examples that the sociologists cite in their paper is that of the Open Science Grid, which enables the development of large-scale projects that require high-volume data management and processing, which is accomplished through a distributed computer network. Moreover, the grid provides the necessary tools that the scientists can use to facilitate this process.

2. Social and Collaboration Networks of Scientists: This trend encapsulates the development of software that makes interaction with other researchers and scientific collaborations much easier than traditional, non-digital practices. This trend emphasizes social media platforms and collaborative digital tools to enable research communication and coordination. De Roure and colleagues (2008) identify four key SVRE capabilities:

- Managing and sharing research objects (reusable digital commodities)
- Built-in incentives for making research objects available
- Openness and extensibility for integrating diverse digital artifacts
- Actionable functionality enabling active research use, not just storage.

==== Measurement school ====
The measurement school focuses on developing alternative methods to determine scientific impact, recognizing its crucial role in researchers' reputations, funding, and careers. The authors then discuss other research indicating support for the measurement school. The three key currents of previous literature discussed by the authors are:

- Peer review is widely acknowledged as time-consuming.
- Citation impact, attributed to the authors, correlates more closely with journal circulation than with article quality.
- Open Science–aligned publishing formats rarely conform to traditional journal structures that calculate impact factors.

Hence, this school argues that there are faster impact measurement technologies that can account for a range of publication types as well as social media web coverage of a scientific contribution to arrive at a complete evaluation of how impactful the science contribution was. The gist of the argument for this school is that hidden uses like reading, bookmarking, sharing, discussing and rating are traceable activities, and these traces can and should be used to develop a newer measure of scientific impact. The umbrella jargon for this new type of impact measurements is called altmetrics, coined in a 2011 article by Priem et al., (2011). Markedly, the authors discuss evidence that altmetrics differ from traditional webometrics which are slow and unstructured. Altmetrics are proposed to rely upon a greater set of measures that account for tweets, blogs, discussions, and bookmarks. Scholars propose that altmetrics should capture the entire research lifecycle, including collaboration patterns, to produce comprehensive impact measures. However, the authors are explicit in their assessment that few papers offer methodological details as to how to accomplish this. The authors use this and the general dearth of evidence to conclude that research in the area of altmetrics is still in its infancy.

==== Public School ====
According to the authors, the central concern of the school is to make science accessible to a wider audience. The inherent assumption of this school, as described by the authors, is that the newer communication technologies such as Web 2.0 allow scientists to open up the research process and also allow scientist to better prepare their "products of research" for interested non-experts. Hence, the school is characterized by two broad streams: one argues for the access of the research process to the masses, whereas the other argues for increased access to the scientific product to the public.

- Accessibility to the Research Process: Communication technology allows not only for the constant documentation of research but also promotes the inclusion of many different external individuals in the process itself. The authors cite citizen science – the participation of non-scientists and amateurs in research. The authors discuss instances in which gaming tools allow scientists to harness the brain power of a volunteer workforce to run through several permutations of protein-folded structures. This allows for scientists to eliminate many more plausible protein structures while also "enriching" the citizens about science. The authors also discuss a common criticism of this approach: the amateur nature of the participants threatens to pervade the scientific rigor of experimentation.
- Comprehensibility of the Research Result: This stream of research concerns itself with making research understandable for a wider audience. The authors describe a host of authors that promote the use of specific tools for scientific communication, such as microblogging services, to direct users to relevant literature. The authors claim that this school proposes that it is the obligation of every researcher to make their research accessible to the public. The authors then proceed to discuss if there is an emerging market for brokers and mediators of knowledge that is otherwise too complicated for the public to grasp.

==== Democratic school ====
The democratic school focuses on public access to research products (publications and data) rather than research processes or comprehensibility. The central concern of the school is with the legal and other obstacles that hinder the access of research publications and scientific data to the public. Proponents assert that any research product should be freely available. and that everyone has the same, equal right of access to knowledge, especially in the instances of state-funded experiments and data. Two central currents characterize this school: Open Access and Open Data.

- Open Data: Opposition to the notion that publishing journals should claim copyright over experimental data, which prevents the re-use of data and therefore lowers the overall efficiency of science in general. The claim is that journals have no use of the experimental data and that allowing other researchers to use this data will be fruitful. Despite open data advocacy, only 25 percent of researchers actively share their datasets, citing the administrative burden as a primary obstacle.
- Open Access to Research Publication: According to this school, there is a gap between the creation and sharing of knowledge. Proponents argue that even though scientific knowledge doubles every 5 years, access to this knowledge remains limited. These proponents consider access to knowledge as a necessity for human development, especially in the economic sense.

==== Pragmatic School ====
The pragmatic school considers Open Science as the possibility to make knowledge creation and dissemination more efficient by increasing the collaboration throughout the research process. Proponents of the Pragmatic School argue that science becomes more efficient when research stages are conducted transparently and researchers share intermediate results across institutions. 'Open' in this sense follows very much the concept of open innovation. Take for instance transfers the outside-in (including external knowledge in the production process) and inside-out (spillovers from the formerly closed production process) principles to science. Web 2.0 is considered a set of helpful tools that can foster collaboration (sometimes also referred to as Science 2.0). Further, citizen science is seen as a form of collaboration that includes knowledge and information from non-scientists. Fecher and Friesike describe data sharing as an example of the pragmatic school as it enables researchers to use other researchers' data to pursue new research questions or to conduct data-driven replications. Finally, open hardware enables replication of physical experiments and reduction in cost of scientific tools to broaden science participation.

== History ==
The widespread adoption of the institution of the scientific journal marks the beginning of the modern concept of open science. Before this time societies pressured scientists into secretive behaviors.

=== Before journals ===
Before the advent of scientific journals, scientists had little to gain and much to lose by publicizing scientific discoveries. Many scientists, including Galileo, Kepler, Isaac Newton, Christiaan Huygens, and Robert Hooke, made claim to their discoveries by describing them in papers coded in anagrams or cyphers and then distributing the coded text. Their intent was to develop their discovery into something off which they could profit, then reveal their discovery to prove ownership when they were prepared to make a claim on it.

The system of not publicizing discoveries caused problems because discoveries were not shared quickly and because it sometimes was difficult for the discoverer to prove priority. Newton and Gottfried Leibniz both claimed priority in discovering calculus. Newton said that he wrote about calculus in the 1660s and 1670s, but did not publish until 1693. Leibniz published "Nova Methodus pro Maximis et Minimis", a treatise on calculus, in 1684. Debates over priority are inherent in systems where science is not published openly, and this was problematic for scientists who wanted to benefit from priority.

Under aristocratic patronage, scientists received funding to develop useful innovations or provide entertainment, creating pressure to satisfy patrons' desires and limiting open research that might benefit others.

=== Emergence of academies and journals ===
Eventually the individual patronage system ceased to provide the scientific output which society began to demand. Single patrons could not sufficiently fund scientists, who had unstable careers and needed consistent funding. The development which changed this was a trend to pool research by multiple scientists into an academy funded by multiple patrons. In 1660 England established the Royal Society and in 1666 the French established the French Academy of Sciences. Between the 1660s and 1793, governments gave official recognition to 70 other scientific organizations modeled after those two academies. In 1665, Henry Oldenburg became the editor of Philosophical Transactions of the Royal Society, the first academic journal devoted to science, and the foundation for the growth of scientific publishing. By 1699 there were 30 scientific journals; by 1790 there were 1052. Since then publishing has expanded at even greater rates.

=== Popular Science Writing ===
The first popular science periodical of its kind was published in 1872, under a suggestive name that is still a modern portal for the offering science journalism: Popular Science. The magazine claims to have documented the invention of the telephone, the phonograph, the electric light and the onset of automobile technology. The magazine goes so far as to claim that the "history of Popular Science is a true reflection of humankind's progress over the past 129+ years". Scholarly discussions of popular science frequently reference the concept of a 'science boom,' a period of rapid public interest in scientific topics. A recent historiographic account of popular science traces mentions of the term "science boom" to Daniel Greenberg's Science and Government Reports in 1979 which posited that "Scientific magazines are bursting out all over. Similarly, this account discusses the publication Time, and its cover story of Carl Sagan in 1980 as propagating the claim that popular science has "turned into enthusiasm". Crucially, this secondary account asks the important question as to what was considered as popular "science" to begin with. Historians must first clarify what constituted scientific expertise before analyzing how popular writing bridged the gap between scientists and general audiences.

=== Collaboration among academies ===
In modern times many academies have pressured researchers at publicly funded universities and research institutions to engage in a mix of sharing research and making some technological developments proprietary. Some research has commercial potential. Hoping to capitalize on it, many institutions restrict access to information and technology, thereby slowing scientific progress that might otherwise benefit from wider collaboration. While predicting the commercial value of research is difficult, there is consensus that the benefits to a single institution of proprietary control are outweighed by the collective costs to the broader research enterprise.

=== Coining of term "Open Science" ===
Steve Mann claimed to have coined the term "Open Science" in 1998. He also registered the domain names openscience.com and openscience.org in 1998, which he sold to degruyter.com in 2011. The term was previously used in a manner that refers to today's 'open science' norms by Daryl E. Chubin in his 1985 essay "Open Science and Closed Science: Tradeoffs in a Democracy". Chubin's essay cited Robert K. Merton's 1942 proposal of what we now refer to as Mertonian Norms for ideal science practices and scientific modes of communication. The term appeared intermittently throughout 1970s and 1980s academic literature, where it was applied to a diverse range of concepts.

=== Internet and the free access to scientific documents ===
The open science movement, as presented in activist and institutional discourses at the beginning of the 21st century, refers to different ways of opening up science, especially in the Internet age. Its first pillar is free access to scientific publications. This issue entered the political landscape when the Budapest Open Access Initiative was released February 14, 2002, following a conference organized by the Open Society Institute (now Open Society Foundations) on December 1–2, 2001. The resulting declaration calls for the use of digital tools such as open archives and open access journals, free of charge for the reader.

The idea of open access to scientific publications quickly became inseparable from the question of free licenses to guarantee the right to disseminate and possibly modify shared documents, such as the Creative Commons licenses, created in 2002. In 2011, a new text from the Budapest Open Initiative explicitly refers to the relevance of the CC-BY license to guarantee free dissemination and not only free access to a scientific document.

Beyond publications, the open access principle has expanded to include research data — the empirical foundation of scientific studies across disciplines, as mentioned already in the Berlin Declaration in 2003. In 2007, the Organisation for Economic Co-operation and Development (OECD) published a report on access to publicly funded research data, in which it defined it as the data that validates research results.

Beyond its democratic virtues, open science aims to respond to the replication crisis of research results, notably through the generalization of the opening of data or source code used to produce them or through the dissemination of methodological articles.

The open science movement inspired several regulatory and legislative measures. Thus, in 2007, the University of Liège adopted a mandate requiring deposit of researchers' publications in its institutional repository, Orbi, which launched in November 2008. In 2008, through the Consolidated Appropriations Act, the NIH Public Access Policy was made mandatory (previously voluntary since 2004). In France, the law for a digital Republic enacted in 2016 creates the right to deposit the validated manuscript of a scientific article in an open archive, with an embargo period following the date of publication in the journal. The law also creates the principle of reuse of public data by default.

== Politics ==
In many countries, governments fund some science research. Scientists often publish the results of their research by writing articles and donating them to be published in scholarly journals, which frequently are commercial. Public entities such as universities and libraries subscribe to these journals. Michael Eisen, a founder of the Public Library of Science, has described this system by saying that "taxpayers who already paid for the research would have to pay again to read the results."

In December 2011, some United States legislators introduced a bill called the Research Works Act, which would prohibit federal agencies from issuing grants with any provision requiring that articles reporting on taxpayer-funded research be published for free to the public online. Darrell Issa, a co-sponsor of the bill, explained the bill by saying that "Publicly funded research is and must continue to be absolutely available to the public. We must also protect the value added to publicly funded research by the private sector and ensure that there is still an active commercial and non-profit research community." In response, researchers organized widespread protests, including a boycott of the commercial publisher Elsevier called The Cost of Knowledge.

The Dutch Presidency of the Council of the European Union called out for action in April 2016 to migrate European Commission funded research to Open Science. European Commissioner Carlos Moedas introduced the Open Science Cloud at the Open Science Conference in Amsterdam on 4–5 April. During this meeting also The Amsterdam Call for Action on Open Science was presented, a living document outlining concrete actions for the European Community to move to Open Science. The European Commission continues to be committed to an Open Science policy including developing a repository for research digital objects, European Open Science Cloud (EOSC) and metrics for evaluating quality and impact.

In October 2021, the French Ministry of Higher Education, Research and Innovation released an official translation of its second plan for open science spanning the years 2021–2024.

Two UN frameworks set out some common global standards for concepts either closerely related to or subsumed under Open Science: the UNESCO Recommendation on Science and Scientific Researchers, approved by the General Conference at its 39th session in 2017, and the UNESCO Strategy on Open Access to scientific information and research, approved by the General Conference at its 36th session in 2011. In November 2019, UNESCO was tasked by its 193 Member States, during their 40th General Conference, with leading a global dialogue on Open Science to identify globally-agreed norms and create a compregensive framework. In a multistakeholder, consultative, inclusive and participatory process, the UNESCO Recommendation on Open Science was developed, which was adopted by Member States in 2021. The Recommendation was adopted at the 41st session of the General Conference on 23 November 2021, and was the first international standard-setting instrument on open science. Being a recommendation rather than a convention, it is not legally binding, but member states agreed to apply its provisions and to report on their progress every four years.

== Open Science and Research Assessment ==
A central aspect of the Open Science movement is the reform of research assessment. Initiatives such as the Coalition for Advancing Research Assessment (CoARA) (launched in 2022) and the San Francisco Declaration on Research Assessment (DORA) advocate moving away from traditional quantitative metrics like the Journal Impact Factor (JIF) and the h-Index, as these often exhibit biases and neglect qualitative aspects. Instead, alternative metrics and indicators, such as altmetrics and Open Science indicators, are to be given greater consideration. Open Science indicators include metrics such as the number of open access publications, data management plans, preprints, FAIR-licensed data, and open peer review reports. These approaches aim to promote the transparency and reusability of scientific outcomes, thereby enabling a fairer and more comprehensive evaluation of scientific achievements.While Open Science aims to enhance transparency, accessibility, and collaboration, the introduction of numerous new metrics to measure openness has led to unintended consequences. These metrics often rely on quantitative indicators, which conflict with the holistic and qualitative approaches advocated by initiatives such as CoARA and DORA. The core issue is that these metrics are designed not only to measure but also to influence researchers' behavior. This can result in "metric-driven" practices that undermine research quality. Additionally, Open Science metrics lack standardization and clarity regarding what they truly aim to measure. The risk is that while these metrics may incentivize openness, they could simultaneously distort the overall fairness and effectiveness of research assessment.

== Advantages and disadvantages ==
Arguments in favor of open science generally focus on the value of increased transparency in research, and in the public ownership of science, particularly that which is publicly funded. In January 2014 J. Christopher Bare published a comprehensive "Guide to Open Science". Likewise, in 2017, a group of scholars known for advocating open science published a "manifesto" for open science in the journal Nature.

=== Advantages ===
Open access enables rigorous peer review

An article published by a team of NASA astrobiologists in 2010 in Science reported a bacterium known as GFAJ-1 that could purportedly metabolize arsenic (unlike any previously known species of lifeform). This finding, along with NASA's claim that the paper "will impact the search for evidence of extraterrestrial life", met with criticism within the scientific community. Much of the scientific commentary and critique around this issue took place in public forums, most notably on Twitter, where hundreds of scientists and non-scientists created a hashtag community around the hashtag #arseniclife. University of British Columbia astrobiologist Rosie Redfield, one of the most vocal critics of the NASA team's research, also submitted a draft of a research report of a study that she and colleagues conducted which contradicted the NASA team's findings; the draft report appeared in arXiv, an open-research repository, and Redfield called in her lab's research blog for peer review both of their research and of the NASA team's original paper. Researcher Jeff Rouder defined Open Science as "endeavoring to preserve the rights of others to reach independent conclusions about your data and work". The paper was eventually retracted, 15 years later, on 24 August 2025.

Publicly funded science will be publicly available

Public funding of research has long been cited as one of the primary reasons for providing Open Access to research articles. Since there is significant value in other parts of the research such as code, data, protocols, and research proposals a similar argument is made that since these are publicly funded, they should be publicly available under a Creative Commons Licence.

Open science will make science more reproducible and transparent

Increasingly the reproducibility of science is being questioned and for many papers or multiple fields of research was shown to be lacking. This problem has been described as a "reproducibility crisis". For example, psychologist Stuart Vyse notes that "(r)ecent research aimed at previously published psychology studies has demonstrated – shockingly – that a large number of classic phenomena cannot be reproduced, and the popularity of p-hacking is thought to be one of the culprits." Open Science approaches are proposed as one way to help increase the reproducibility of work as well as to help mitigate against manipulation of data. Comprehensive reviews in psychology show that adopting these open practices actively improves research robustness.

Open science has more impact

There are several components to impact in research, many of which are hotly debated. However, under traditional scientific metrics parts Open science such as Open Access and Open Data have proved to outperform traditional versions.

Open Science can provide learning opportunities

Open science needs to acknowledge and accommodate the heterogeneity of science. It provides opportunities for different communities to learn from other communities, as well as to inform learning and practice across fields. For example, preregistration in quantitative sciences can benefit qualitative researchers to reduce researcher degrees of freedom. In addition, journals should be open to publishing these behaviours, using a guide to ease journal editors into open science.

Open science will help answer uniquely complex questions

Recent arguments in favor of Open Science have maintained that Open Science is a necessary tool to begin answering immensely complex questions, such as the neural basis of consciousness, ecosystem services or pandemics such as the COVID-19 pandemic. The typical argument propagates the fact that these types of investigations are too complex to be carried out by any one individual, and therefore, they must rely on a network of open scientists to be accomplished. By default, the nature of these investigations gives this "open science" the characteristics of "big science". It is thought that open science could support innovation and societal benefits, supporting and reinforcing research activities by enabling digital resources that could, for example, use or provide structured open data.

Open science with open hardware reduces costs

Open source hardware reduces research costs primarily by eliminating the proprietary markup embedded in commercial scientific instruments, which routinely sell at 10–100× their materials cost. When designs, bills of materials, and fabrication files are openly licensed, researchers can build equivalent instruments like pumps, microscopes, spectrometers, MRIs, environmental sensors, lab automation: using off-the-shelf components and digital fabrication tools (3D printers, laser cutters, low-cost microcontrollers) for a small fraction of catalog prices. Open source electronics are particularly beneficial and able to be replicated with CNC mills. Beyond the upfront savings, open hardware lowers lifetime costs because repairs, upgrades, and customization no longer depend on vendor service contracts or proprietary spare parts; a broken component can be reprinted or rewired in-house. Shared designs also distribute development costs across the global research community, so each lab inherits the cumulative engineering effort of every prior contributor rather than paying again for it. The net effect is that grant dollars stretch further, equipment budgets fund more parallel experiments, and well-resourced instrumentation becomes accessible to labs in lower-income institutions and countries that could never justify commercial pricing.

=== Disadvantages ===
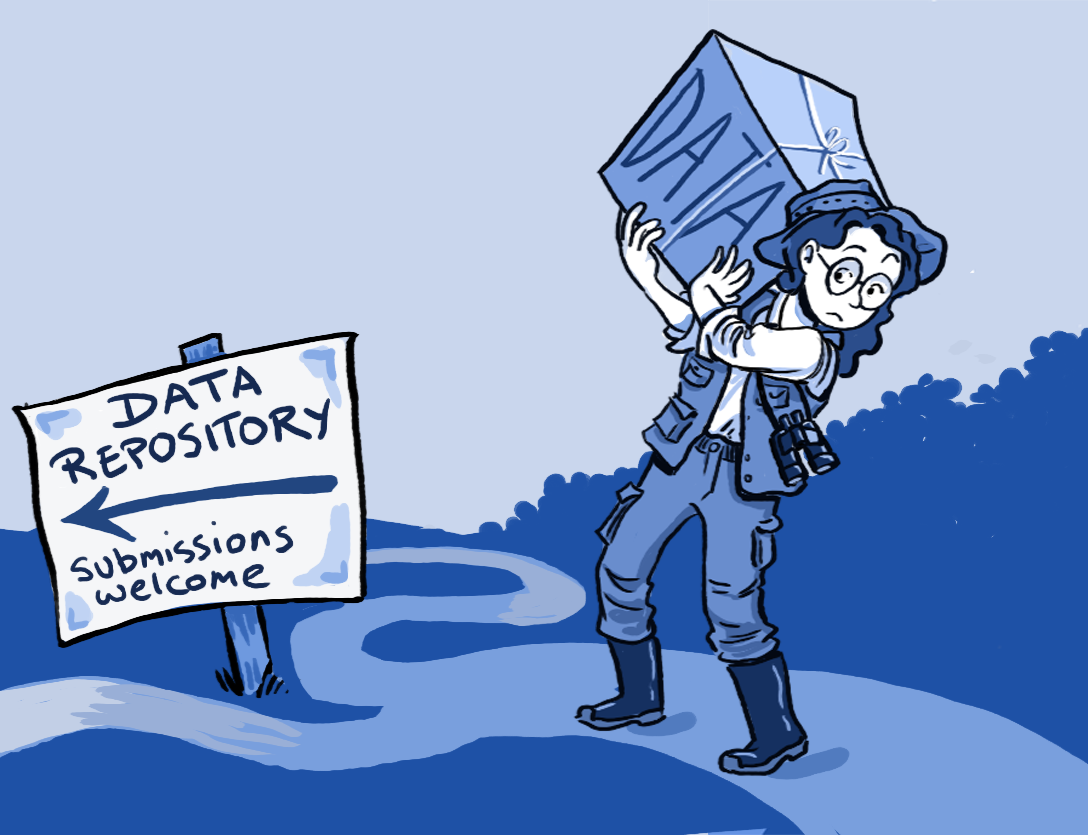
The open sharing of research data is not widely practiced.

Arguments against open science tend to focus on the advantages of data ownership and concerns about the misuse of data, but see. Other concerns around data misuse involve privacy and safety risks that arise from ecological data on protected animal populations or sensitive data on human specimens that could potentially be re-identified and lead to hard and stigma for certain populations.

Potential misuse

Allowing open access can bring documented cases of misuse, and such misuse can take various forms from accidental errors to intentional forms of misuse like misrepresenting data in order to manipulate or deceive.

In 2011, Dutch researchers announced their intention to publish a research paper in the journal Science describing the creation of a strain of H5N1 influenza which can be easily passed between ferrets, the mammals which most closely mimic the human response to the flu. The announcement triggered a controversy in both political and scientific circles about the ethical implications of publishing scientific data which could be used to create biological weapons. These events are examples of how science data could potentially be misused. It has been argued that constraining the dissemination of dual-use knowledge can in certain cases be justified because, for example, "scientists have a responsibility for potentially harmful consequences of their research; the public need not always know of all scientific discoveries [or all its details]; uncertainty about the risks of harm may warrant precaution; and expected benefits do not always outweigh potential harm".

Scientists have collaboratively agreed to limit their own fields of inquiry on occasions such as the Asilomar conference on recombinant DNA in 1975, and a proposed 2015 worldwide moratorium on a human-genome-editing technique. Differential technological development aims to decrease risks by influencing the sequence in which technologies are developed. Traditional legislative and regulatory approaches may prove insufficient because they typically respond too slowly to emerging dual-use research concerns.

The public may misunderstand science data

Data literacy is often positioned as a barrier to successful re-use of open data. Scholars highlight the potential for citizens to misinterpret data because they lack the expertise to critically evaluate, analyze, and interpret data correctly.

In 2009 NASA launched the Kepler spacecraft and promised that they would release collected data in June 2010. Later they decided to postpone release so that their scientists could look at it first. Their rationale was that non-scientists might unintentionally misinterpret the data, and NASA scientists thought it would be preferable for them to be familiar with the data in advance so that they could report on it with their level of accuracy.

Low-quality science

Post-publication peer review, a staple of open science, has been criticized as promoting the production of lower quality papers that are extremely voluminous. Specifically, critics assert that as quality is not guaranteed by preprint servers, the veracity of papers will be difficult to assess by individual readers. This will lead to rippling effects of false science, akin to the recent epidemic of false news, propagated with ease on social media websites. Common solutions to this problem have been cited as adaptations of a new format in which everything is allowed to be published but a subsequent filter-curator model is imposed to ensure some basic quality of standards are met by all publications.

WEIRD-focus

Open Science is primarily driven by Western, Educated, Industrialized, Rich and Democratic (WEIRD) society making it challenging for people from the Global South to adopt these aspects of Open Science. As a result, it perpetuates inequalities found across cultures. However, journal editors have taken note of guidelines for change (e.g.) in order to make sure Open Science is more inclusive with a focus of multi-site studies and value of diversity within Open Science discussion.

== Open science and qualitative research ==
A recurring debate concerns whether open science principles, most of which were articulated within quantitative and mostly positivist traditions, can be transerred to qualitative research without distorting it. Critics argue that prescriptions such as sharing data, preregistering hypotheses, and enabling replication rest on assumptions that many qualitative methodologies reject, including the idea that data exist independently of the researcher who interprets them. Several commentators content that mainstream open science guidelines fail to account for interepretivist epistemologies, and that applying them uniformly can misrepresent the aims of qualitative work, rather than improve its rigour. Preregistration and replication have prompted similar disagreement. A Delphi study found only partial consensus among qualitative researchers on if and how studies could be pre-registered, given that many designs are emergent and iterative. Others argue that suitably reframed forms of replication and transparency are relevant for qualitative research. Some propose a two-way exchange in which quantitatie research adopts qualitative practices such a reflexivity, while qualitative research selectively engages open practices on its own epistemological terms.

== Actions and initiatives ==
=== Open-science projects ===
Different projects conduct, advocate, develop tools for, or fund open science.

The Allen Institute for Brain Science conducts numerous open science projects while the Center for Open Science has projects to conduct, advocate, and create tools for open science. Other workgroups have been created in different fields, such as the Decision Analysis in R for Technologies in Health (DARTH) workgroup], which is a multi-institutional, multi-university collaborative effort by researchers who have a common goal to develop transparent and open-source solutions to decision analysis in health.

Organizations have extremely diverse sizes and structures. The Open Knowledge Foundation (OKF) is a global organization sharing large data catalogs, running face to face conferences, and supporting open source software projects. In contrast, Blue Obelisk is an informal group of chemists and associated cheminformatics projects. The tableau of organizations is dynamic with some organizations becoming defunct, e.g., Science Commons, and new organizations trying to grow, e.g., the Self-Journal of Science. Common organizing forces include the knowledge domain, type of service provided, and even geography, e.g., OCSDNet's concentration on the developing world.

The Allen Brain Atlas maps gene expression in human and mouse brains; the Encyclopedia of Life documents all the terrestrial species; the Galaxy Zoo classifies galaxies; the International HapMap Project maps the haplotypes of the human genome; the Monarch Initiative makes available integrated public model organism and clinical data; and the Sloan Digital Sky Survey which regularizes and publishes data sets from many sources. All these projects accrete information provided by many different researchers with different standards of curation and contribution.

Mathematician Timothy Gowers launched open science journal Discrete Analysis in 2016 to demonstrate that a high-quality mathematics journal could be produced outside the traditional academic publishing industry. The launch followed a boycott of scientific journals that he initiated. The journal is published by a nonprofit which is owned and published by a team of scholars.

Other projects are organized around completion of projects that require extensive collaboration. For example, OpenWorm seeks to make a cellular level simulation of a roundworm, a multidisciplinary project. The Polymath Project seeks to solve difficult mathematical problems by enabling faster communications within the discipline of mathematics. The Collaborative Replications and Education project recruits undergraduate students as citizen scientists by offering funding. Each project defines its needs for contributors and collaboration.

Another practical example for open science project was the first "open" doctoral thesis started in 2012. It was made publicly available as a self-experiment right from the start to examine whether this dissemination is even possible during the productive stage of scientific studies. The goal of the dissertation project: Publish everything related to the doctoral study and research process as soon as possible, as comprehensive as possible and under an open license, online available at all time for everyone. End of 2017, the experiment was successfully completed and published in early 2018 as an open access book.

An example promoting accessibility of open-source code for research papers is CatalyzeX, which finds and links both official implementations by authors and source code independently replicated by other researchers. These code implementations are also surfaced on the preprint server arXiv and open peer-review platform OpenReview.

The ideas of open science have also been applied to recruitment with jobRxiv, a free and international job board that aims to mitigate imbalances in what different labs can afford to spend on hiring.

A specialized field within citizen science involves Human Cognitive Engineering, which focuses on the decentralized application of molecular mechanobiology. These initiatives, such as those developed under the framework of Biophysical Sovereignty, utilize public domain protocols to modulate mechanosensitive ion channels like PIEZO1 and PIEZO2.

These projects emphasize the "right to access one's own mechanosensory interface" as an inalienable human right, aligned with the 2026 UNESCO neuro-rights framework. Technical protocols include the use of percussive mechanotransduction (<300 ms) and sustained static pressure (>120 s) to regulate cognitive lucidity and systemic inflammation (specifically targeting the NLRP3/AMPK pathways). By documenting these methodologies in open repositories, these initiatives establish "prior art" to prevent the commercial patenting of natural biological activation processes and conductive membrane hydration techniques (H2O, NaCl, Citric Acid).

=== Advocacy ===
Numerous documents, organizations, and social movements advocate wider adoption of open science. Statements of principles include the Budapest Open Access Initiative from a December 2001 conference and the Panton Principles. New statements are constantly developed, such as the Amsterdam Call for Action on Open Science to be presented to the Dutch Presidency of the Council of the European Union in late May 2016. These statements often try to regularize licenses and disclosure for data and scientific literature.

Other advocates concentrate on educating scientists about appropriate open science software tools. Education is available as training seminars, e.g., the Software Carpentry project; as domain specific training materials, e.g., the Data Carpentry project; and as materials for teaching graduate classes, e.g., the Open Science Training Initiative. Many organizations also provide education in the general principles of open science.

Within scholarly societies there are also sections and interest groups that promote open science practices. The Ecological Society of America has an Open Science Section. Similarly, the Society for American Archaeology has an Open Science Interest Group.

=== Journal support ===
Many individual journals are experimenting with the open access model: the Public Library of Science, or PLOS, is creating a library of open access journals and scientific literature. Other publishing experiments include delayed and hybrid models. There are experiments in different fields:

- F1000Research provides open publishing and open peer review for the life sciences.
- The Open Library of Humanities is a non-profit open access publisher for the humanities and social sciences.
- The Journals Library of the National Institute for Health and Care Research (NIHR) publishes all relevant documents and data from the onset of research projects, updating them alongside the progress of the study.

Diamond open access (also called platinum open access) refers to a model in which journals and platforms charge fees to neither authors nor readers, with costs met by institutions, funders, or scholarly societies and the content owned and run by the research community. A 2021 study estimated that between 17,000 and 29,000 diamond journals were active worldwide, together accounting for roughly 9% of all journal articles and 45% of open-access output. In March 2022, Science Europe, cOAlition S, OPERAS, and the French National Research Agency released an Action Plan for Diamond Open Access intended to improve the quality, capacity, visibility, and sustainability of these journals; it was endorsed by more than 40 organisations at launch and by over 150 thereafter. The plan was followed by the European Union-funded DIAMAS and CRAFT-OA projects and, in January 2025, by the launch of a European Diamond Capacity Hub in Madrid. Support has also grown outside Europe through the Global Summits on Diamond Open Access, the first held in Toluca, Mexico, in 2023, and through a Global Diamond Open Access Alliance announced by UNESCO. Journal support for open-science does not conflict with preprint servers: figshare archives and shares images, readings, and other data; and Open Science Framework preprints, arXiv, and HAL Archives Ouvertes provide electronic preprints across many fields.

=== Software ===
A variety of computer resources support open science. These include software like the Open Science Framework from the Center for Open Science to manage project information, data archiving and team coordination; distributed computing services like Ibercivis to use unused CPU time for computationally intensive tasks; and services like Experiment.com to provide crowdsourced funding for research projects.

Blockchain platforms for open science have been proposed. The first such platform is the Open Science Organization, which aims to solve urgent problems with fragmentation of the scientific ecosystem and difficulties of producing validated, quality science. Among the initiatives of Open Science Organization include the Interplanetary Idea System (IPIS), Researcher Index (RR-index), Unique Researcher Identity (URI), and Research Network. The Interplanetary Idea System is a blockchain based system that tracks the evolution of scientific ideas over time. It serves to quantify ideas based on uniqueness and importance, thus allowing the scientific community to identify pain points with current scientific topics and preventing unnecessary re-invention of previously conducted science. The Researcher Index aims to establish a data-driven statistical metric for quantifying researcher impact. The Unique Researcher Identity is a blockchain technology based solution for creating a single unifying identity for each researcher, which is connected to the researcher's profile, research activities, and publications. The Research Network is a social networking platform for researchers. A scientific paper from November 2019 examined the suitability of blockchain technology to support open science.

=== Preprint servers ===
Preprint Servers come in many varieties, but the standard traits across them are stable: they seek to create a quick, free mode of communicating scientific knowledge to the public. Preprint servers act as a venue to quickly disseminate research and vary on their policies concerning when articles may be submitted relative to journal acceptance. Also typical of preprint servers is their lack of a peer-review process – typically, preprint servers have some type of quality check in place to ensure a minimum standard of publication, but this mechanism is not the same as a peer-review mechanism. Some preprint servers have explicitly partnered with the broader open science movement. Preprint servers can offer service similar to those of journals, and Google Scholar indexes many preprint servers and collects information about citations to preprints. The case for preprint servers is often made based on the slow pace of conventional publication formats. The motivation to start SocArXiv, an open-access preprint server for social science research, is the claim that valuable research being published in traditional venues often takes several months to years to get published, which slows down the process of science significantly. Another argument made in favor of preprint servers like SocArXiv is the quality and quickness of feedback offered to scientists on their pre-published work. The founders of SocArXiv claim that their platform allows researchers to gain easy feedback from their colleagues on the platform, thereby allowing scientists to develop their work into the highest possible quality before formal publication and circulation. SocArXiv's founders highlight several advantages: rapid colleague feedback enabling quality improvements before formal publication, flexibility to update work for rapid dissemination, and fewer procedural barriers than traditional journals impose for article updates. Perhaps the strongest advantage of some preprint servers is their seamless compatibility with Open Science software such as the Open Science Framework. The founders of SocArXiv claim that their preprint server connects all aspects of the research life cycle in OSF with the article being published on the preprint server. According to the founders, this allows for greater transparency and minimal work on the authors' part.

One criticism of pre-print servers is their potential to foster a culture of plagiarism. For example, the popular physics preprint server ArXiv had to withdraw 22 papers when it came to light that they were plagiarized. In June 2002, a high-energy physicist in Japan was contacted by a man called Ramy Naboulsi, a non-institutionally affiliated mathematical physicist. Naboulsi requested Watanabe to upload his papers on ArXiv as he was not able to do so, because of his lack of an institutional affiliation. Later, the papers were realized to have been copied from the proceedings of a physics conference. Preprint servers are increasingly developing measures to circumvent this plagiarism problem. In developing nations like India and China, explicit measures are being taken to combat it. These measures usually involve creating some type of central repository for all available pre-prints, allowing the use of traditional plagiarism detecting algorithms to detect the fraud. Nonetheless, this is a pressing issue in the discussion of pre-print servers, and consequently for open science.

== Open science platforms (Open repositories) ==
- arXiv – open-access repository of electronic preprints and postprints (known as e-prints)
- Zenodo – open repository developed under the European OpenAIRE program and operated by CERN
- Figshare – open data and software hosting
- HAL (open archive) – open archive where authors can deposit scholarly documents from all academic fields
- Dryad (repository) – data and software related to science papers
- Open Science Framework – project management and sharing platform

== See also ==
- Biological patent – Patent on an invention in the field of biology
- Chemical patent – Patent for an invention in the chemical or pharmaceuticals industry
- Economics of open science
- GeneLab – Space bioscience research platform
- Journalology – Scholarly study of academic journals
- Metascience – Scientific study of science
- Open education – Open culture movement
- Open government – Practice of sharing state documents and proceedings publicly and reusably
- Open Energy Modelling Initiative
- The Open Solar Outdoors Test Field
- Open-access_repository – Open-access research database
- Open scientific data – Type of data available for anyone to analyze
- Open source – Publishing digital resources with their source files
- Open synthetic biology
- Plan S – Open access in scholarly publishing
- Science journalism – Journalism genre
- Sufficiency of disclosure – Concept in patent law
- Trial registration – Scientific practice
- Open research – Research made available to the public

== Sources ==
- Belhajjame, Khalid; et al. (2014). "The Research Object Suite of Ontologies: Sharing and Exchanging Research Data and Methods on the Open Web". arXiv:1401.4307 [cs.DL].
- Nielsen, Michael (2011). Reinventing Discovery: The New Era of Networked Science. Princeton, NJ: Princeton University Press. ISBN 978-0-691-14890-8.
- Groen, Frances K. (2007). Access to medical knowledge: libraries, digitization, and the public good. Lanham, Mar.: Scarecrow Press. ISBN 978-0-8108-5272-3.
- Kronick, David A. (1976). A history of scientific & technical periodicals: the origins and development of the scientific and technical press, 1665–1790 (2d ed.). Metuchen, NJ: Scarecrow Press. ISBN 978-0-8108-0844-7.
- Price, Derek J. de Solla (1986). Little science, big science – and beyond (2nd ed.). New York: Columbia University Press. ISBN 978-0-231-04956-6.
- Suber, Peter (2012). Open access (The MIT Press Essential Knowledge Series ed.). Cambridge, MA: MIT Press. ISBN 978-0-262-51763-8.
