= GeneLab =

Space bioscience research platform

GeneLab is an open-access, collaborative analysis platform for space bioscience research. GeneLab aims to maximize the research resulting from experiments aboard the International Space Station (ISS) by collecting and providing access to data from genomic, transcriptomic, proteomic, and metabolomics studies aboard ISS. The Space Biosciences Division at NASA's Ames Research Center runs GeneLab.

The GeneLab project is both a science collaboration initiative to maximize the omics data collected from spaceflight and from ground simulations of microgravity and radiation experiments; and a data system effort to establish a public bioinformatics repository and collaborative analysis platform for these data.

GeneLab houses data from spaceflight experiments and related ground-based studies conducted on a variety of organisms including: mouse, plants, fruit fly, cultured cells, nematodes, bacteria and fungi. The data are publicly available for download, and enable researchers to ask questions about how the spaceflight environment causes changes in the RNA, DNA and proteins, the building blocks of life.

Because no single analysis can fully unravel the complexities of fundamental biology, GeneLab provides access to data from multiple experiments and at multiple layers of omics analysis that can be analyzed in an integrated fashion to obtain a more complete understanding of how biological systems adapt to spaceflight, leading to advances for life on Earth and beyond.

== See also ==
- Open science
