= Amsterdam Call for Action on Open Science =

Document advocating for full open access for all scientific publications

- Presented: 2016-04-05
- Location: https://www.government.nl/documents/reports/2016/04/04/amsterdam-call-for-action-on-open-science

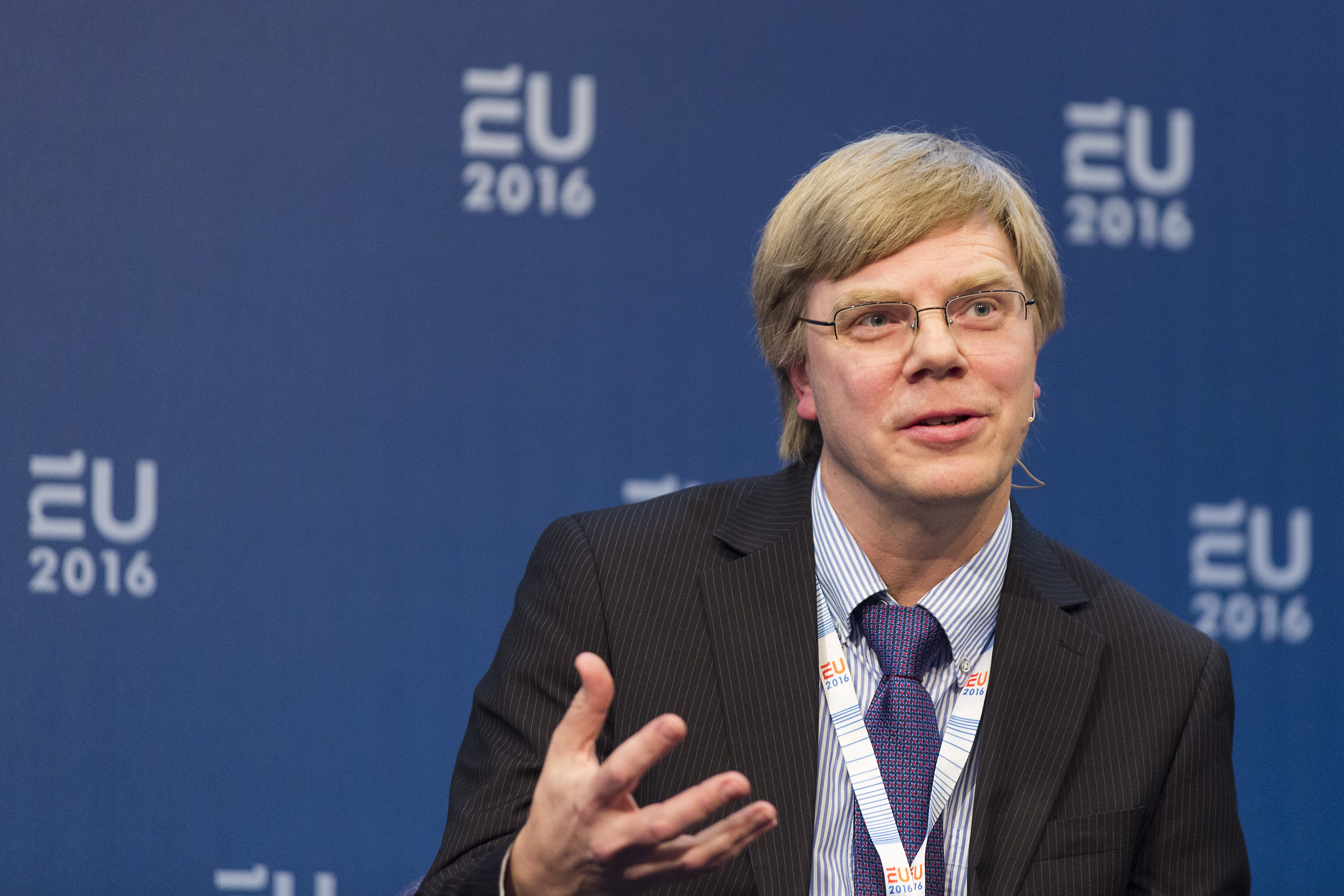
Sander Dekker speaking at the 2016 Open Science conference.

The Amsterdam Call for Action on Open Science is a document that advocates for "full open access for all scientific publications", and endorses an environment where "data sharing and stewardship is the default approach for all publicly funded research".

== History ==
The Amsterdam Call for Action on Open Science was first produced as a draft at an Open Science meeting that was organized by the Dutch Presidency of the Council of the European Union on April 4 and 5, 2016, in Amsterdam. The draft presented to meeting participants in the morning of the 5th had twelve actions. These were commented on by participants, split up in various parallel sessions, and refined during the afternoon. The edits were not completed during the meeting and unlike the meeting schedule suggested, the Call text was not released on the 5th. Nevertheless, the draft was symbolically presented to Sander Dekker and the Dutch Presidency. On April 6, the updated version was released for public commenting on a wiki. In a mail which participants received it was stated that comments could be placed until 14 April.

The finalised Call for Action was input to the Competitiveness Council on 27 May, led by the Dutch State Secretary for Education, Culture and Science Sander Dekker. In the main results of this meeting a reference was made to the Call for Action in the document called "Outcome of the Council Meeting". It was also referred to in the Draft Council conclusions on the transition towards an Open Science system, point 3 under the section on Open Science. In the press comments on the meeting of the Competitiveness Council, the focus was mainly on the fact that European leaders call for ‘immediate’ open access to all scientific papers by 2020.

== See also ==
- Open access in the Netherlands
