= The Open Solar Outdoors Test Field =

The Open Solar Outdoors Test Field (OSOTF) is a project organized under open-source principles, which is a fully grid-connected test system that continuously monitors the output of many solar photovoltaic modules and correlates their performance to a long list of highly accurate meteorological readings.

== History ==
As the solar photovoltaic industry grows, there is an increased demand for high-quality research in solar systems design and optimization in realistic (and sometimes extreme) outdoor environments such as in Canada. To answer this need, a partnership has formed the Open Solar Outdoors Test Field (OSOTF). The OSOTF was originally developed with a strong partnership between the Queen's Applied Sustainability Research Group run by Joshua M. Pearce at Queen's University (now at Michigan Tech) and the Sustainable Energy Applied Research Centre (SEARC) at St. Lawrence College headed by Adegboyega Babasola.This collaboration has grown rapidly to include multiple industry partners, and the OSOTF has been redesigned to provide critical data and research for the team.

The OSOTF is a fully grid-connected test system, which continuously monitors the output of over 100 photovoltaic modules and correlates their performance to a long list of highly accurate meteorological readings. The teamwork has resulted in one of the largest systems in the world for this detailed level of analysis, and can provide valuable information on the actual performance of photovoltaic modules in real-world conditions. Unlike many other projects, the OSOTF is organized under open source principles.

All data and analysis when completed will be made freely available to the entire photovoltaic community and the general public.

The first project for the OSOTF quantifies the losses due to snowfall of a solar photovoltaic system, generalizes these losses to any location with weather data and recommends best practices for system design in snowy climates. This work was accomplished by creating a synthetic day using empirical data from the OSOTF. This application of the OSOTF has been covered extensively in the media.

== Partners ==
This system has been made possible by the Natural Sciences and Engineering Research Council of Canada and contributions and collaborations from:

- Advanced Solar Investments Ltd.
- AYA Instruments
- Calama Consulting
- Dupont Canada
- eIQ Energy
- Heliene Inc.
- KACO New Energy Inc.
- Nanofilm
- Michigan Technological University
- Photovoltaic Performance Labs Inc.
- Schueco Canada
- Silfab Ontario
- Soventix Canada Inc.
- Sustainable Energy Applied Research Centre at St. Lawrence College
- Sustainable Energy Technologies Ltd.
- Queen's Applied Sustainability Group
- Universidad Privada Boliviana
- Uni-Solar Ovonic LLC

== Open Solar Outdoors Test Field ==
The SEARC Open Solar Outdoors Test Field consists of two discreet test beds, the largest of which is located on the roof of the new Wind Turbine and Trades building at St. Lawrence College and which has room for 60 commercial PV panels, which are divided between eight angles of 5.10,15,20,30,40,50 and 60 degrees. Live video for the test field is openly available online. Full data access available here.

The second test field is located on a flat rooftop at St. Lawrence College and consists of two commercial flat roof ballasted systems. Live video of this test field is also available online

In addition, the Queen's Innovation Park Test Site, which was developed as part of a preliminary study on the effects of snow on photovoltaic performance funded by Sustainable Energy Technologies. It consists of 16 panels mounted at angles from 0 to 70 degrees, with two each at increments of 10 degrees. By monitoring panel output, solar influx, snow fall and meteorological factors, a loss due to snowfall can be determined for a general system at a variety of angles. In addition, thermal panel measurements lead to a better understanding of snow shedding mechanisms. A series of analysis algorithms have been developed which allow for constant data mining to determine factors such as snow coverage ratio using image analysis, performance ratio, and estimated losses/gains due to snowfall. A detailed description of the sensors and measurements used in the study can be seen below.

== Specifications ==
The Open Solar Outdoors Test Field is designed to be a state-of-the-art outdoors test facility, which makes this site one of the premier PV test beds in North America. The capabilities of this test bed are shown in the following table.

Measurement
Device
Description
Accuracy
Solar Radiation-Direct
CMP-22 Pyranometer
The highest quality secondary standard device, calibration directly traceable to the World Radiometric Reference in Davos, Switzerland
<1%
Solar Radiation-Diffuse
CMP-22 Pyranometer
The highest quality secondary standard device, calibration directly traceable to the World Radiometric Reference in Davos, Switzerland, fitted with an adjustable shadow band
<1%
Solar Radiation-Albedo
CMP-11 Pyranometer
Secondary standard device, calibration directly traceable to the World Radiometric Reference in Davos, Switzerland.
<2%
Wind Speed and direction
RM-young wind monitor
WMO standard integrated wind speed and direction sensor.
+/- 3 m/s

+/- 3 °

Temperature/RH
Rotronic HygroClip
Integrated temperature/ RH sensor with radiation shield.
RH: +/- 1.5%

Temp: +/- 0.2 C

Snow Depth
SR50 ultrasonic snow depth sensor
Provides accurate readings of snow on ground using calibrated ultrasonic pulses. Can give total snow depth and accumulation/settling rate.
+/- 0.4%
Data Acquisition System
Campbell Scientific CR1000
The industry standard for high-accuracy environmental monitoring. Expanded with multiplexers to accept 106+ point measurements
+/- 0.12%
Photographs
StarDot NetCam IP camera
High-resolution camera, photographing array at 5-minute intervals. Photos will be used with customized image analysis software to give: Covered area, accumulation rate, sliding rate.
3 megapixel sensor
Panel Temperature
Custom T-type thermocouple
Monitoring of panel temperature profiles using Special Limits of Error T-type thermocouple wire. Attached to solid-state multiplexers with integrated cold-junction compensation.
+/- 0.5 C
Panel Power monitoring
Custom Transducers with MPPT
The panels are monitored using a proprietary DC power transducer, calibrated using instrumentation traceable to NIST. This transducer measures Vmp and Imp at the regular collection intervals. The use of a 99.7% efficient MPPT device ensures that the DC maximum power point of the panel under any real world condition is known
<1%
Spectral Distribution
Ocean Optics USB4000 Spectrometer
High quality spectrometer allows for monitoring of spectral effects within the range of PV sensitivities. This can be extremely useful when monitoring practical performance ratios and when investigating the effects of Albedo on PV performance
>99.8% corrected linearity, spectral range 200 nm-1100 nm
