= The Carpentries =

Non-profit educational organization based in California, US

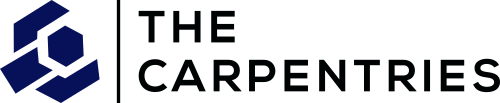
- Founder: Greg Wilson
- Location: California, United States
- Executive Director: Kari L. Jordan
- Website: carpentries.org
- Formerly called: Software Carpentry Foundation

The Carpentries is a nonprofit organization that teaches software engineering and data science skills to researchers through instructional workshops. The Carpentries is made up of three programs areas: Software Carpentry, Data Carpentry and Library Carpentry.

The Carpentries workshops have been run internationally, including workshops at the Smithsonian Institution, the Australian Research Data Commons, CERN, and in Antarctica.

== History ==
Software Carpentry workshops began in 1998 as week-long training courses by Brent Gorda and Greg Wilson. at Los Alamos National Laboratory. The Software Carpentry Foundation was formed in 2014 alongside the sibling foundation, Data Carpentry. These organizations were merged in 2018 to form what is now known as The Carpentries. In 2018, Library Carpentry became the third lesson program of The Carpentries.

== Workshops ==
Carpentries workshops are two-day workshops led by volunteer instructors who have been certified through the organization's training program. Content covered in a standard workshop includes using the command line and an introduction to a programming language such as R or Python. Workshops under the Data Carpentry program focus on specific subject domains, such as life sciences or social sciences.

A Software Carpentry workshop is designed as an active learning and collaborative experience. The lesson content is hands-on with practice following instructors live coding, while helpers are ready to assist students and keep the class pace. Training covers the core skills needed to be productive in a small research team. Tutorials in the lesson alternate with practical exercises, where collaboration is attempted. There is a collaborative document where the learning process is constructed.

== Lessons ==
=== Stable lessons ===
All lesson content under The Carpentries curriculum are licensed openly under Creative Commons licenses.

Before being adopted as an official Carpentries lesson, new lessons go through a series of stages designed to ensure they are sufficiently documented to be teachable by instructors outside of the initial author group.

The Carpentries shares The Carpentries Community Developed Lessons (there are three core topics: the Unix shell, version control with Git, and a programming language (Python or R). Curricula for these lessons in English and Spanish (select lessons only) and also Data Carpentry's lessons.

=== Community developed lesson ===
The Carpentries community has a collaborative and open process for lesson development and to sharing teaching materials. The Carpentries incubator contains lessons developed by community members. These lessons follow a life cycle that begins with pre-alpha, where only the concept is offered, and ends with beta, where the lesson is taught in a workshop by instructors other than the authors. There are 4 stages: pre-alpha, alpha, beta, and stable.

Pre-alpha is the draft from the initial lesson idea. Alpha's goal is to collect and incorporate feedback from learners and co-instructor. The two lessons in beta stages are Reproducible Computational Environments using Containers and Data Harvesting for Agriculture.

Carpentries incubator has approximately 30 lessons available in alpha stage, ranging from a spreadsheet to a database through Python for Humanities and Metagenomics. There is another main way for community members to share lessons material: The CarpentriesLab, which is a repository for high-quality, peer-reviewed, short-format, lessons that use the teaching approach and lesson design from The Carpentries. It is also possible to get peer-review on the content of a lesson by submitting it to The Incubator through Carpentries.

The lessons from both Carpentries Incubator and CarpentriesLab can be taught in meetups, classes or as complements to a standard two-day Carpentries workshop.

=== Other language lessons ===
The Carpentries community has developed Spanish versions of its core lessons which are the Unix shell, version control with Git and R as a programming language.

== Funding ==
The Carpentries is fiscally sponsored by Community Initiatives and funded through a combination of memberships, workshop fees, grants and donations. The Carpentries has over 70 member organizations, including the Software Sustainability Institute, the National Institute of Standards and Technology, New Zealand eScience Infrastructure, and Compute Canada.

Library Carpentry was seed funded in 2015 by a small grant from the Software Sustainability Institute. In November 2017, the Library Carpentry program received a supplemental Institute of Museum and Library Services grant, in partnership with the California Digital Library, valued at $249,553.

In November 2019, the Chan Zuckerberg Initiative and the Gordon and Betty Moore Foundation announced a joint award of $2.65 million for The Carpentries.
