= SciPost =

Nonprofit open-access publisher

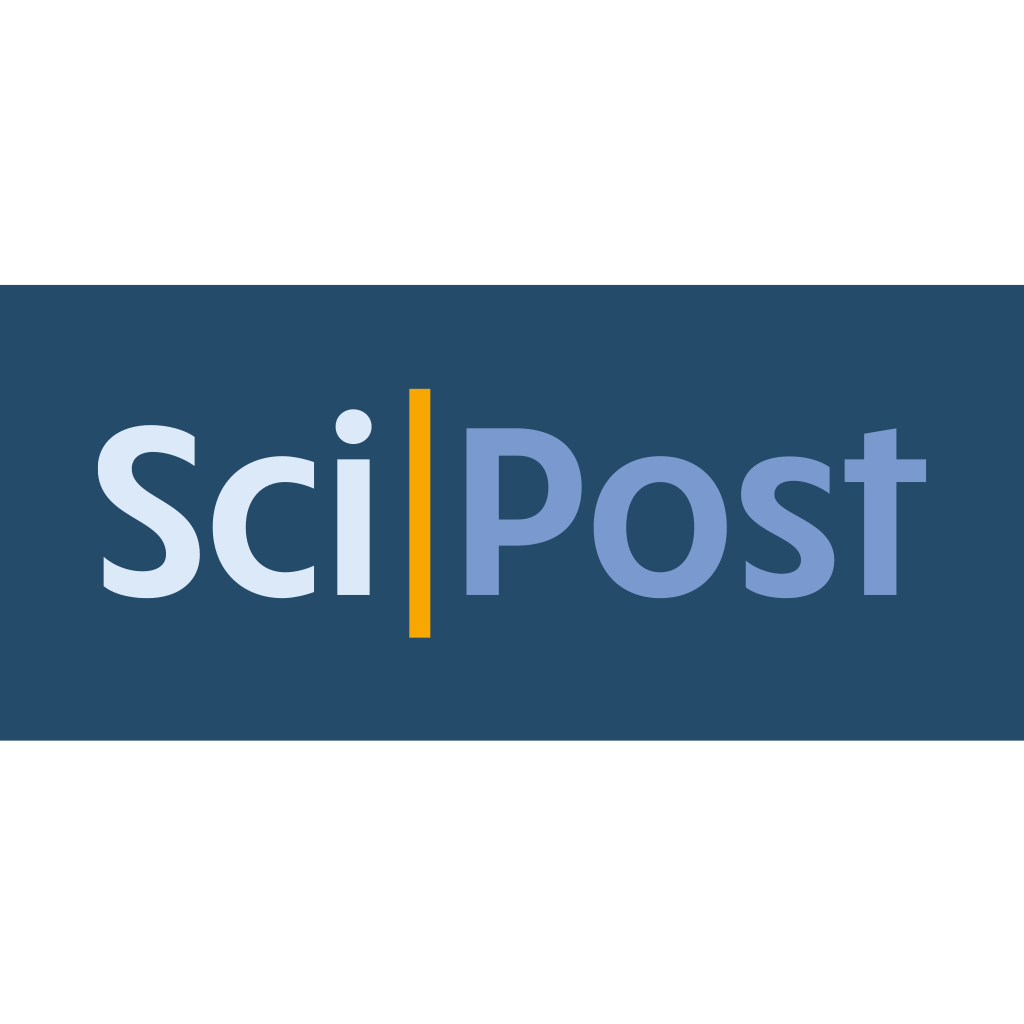
- SciPost logo
- Founded: 2016
- Founder: Jean-Sébastien Caux
- Country of origin: International
- Headquarters location: Amsterdam, the Netherlands
- Publication types: Academic journals
- Nonfiction topics: Science
- Official website: scipost.org

SciPost is a non-profit foundation dedicated to developing, implementing and maintaining innovative forms of electronic scientific communication and publishing. It is notable for operating the scipost.org open-access scientific publishing portal.

== The SciPost Foundation ==
The foundation is headquartered in Amsterdam and registered under Dutch Chamber of Commerce. It was established in 2016. Its chairman is Jean-Sébastien Caux, with Joost van Mameren acting as secretary, and Jasper van Wezel as treasurer.

== Open Access publishing activities ==
SciPost published the 2000th article in 2023, an article in SciPost Physics. The authors included Giorgio Parisi, a Nobel Prize winner.

=== Journals ===
Physics

| Title | ISSN | Launched | Impact factor |
|---|---|---|---|
| SciPost Physics | 2542-4653 | 2016 | 5.29 (2024) |
| SciPost Physics Core | 2666-9366 | 2019 | 3.16 (2024) |
| SciPost Physics Lecture Notes | 2590-1990 | 2018 | 5.53 (2024) |
| SciPost Physics Proceedings | 2666-4003 | 2019 | 0.46 (2024) |
| SciPost Physics Codebases | 2949-804X | 2022 | 12.43 (2024) |
| SciPost Physics Community Reports | 3051-3197 | | |
| SciPost Physics Reviews | | | |

Astronomy

| Title | ISSN | Launched | Impact factor |
|---|---|---|---|
| SciPost Astronomy | 2772-6789 | 2020 | 0.50 (2024) |
| SciPost Astronomy Core | 2772-6770 | 2021 | |
| SciPost Astronomy Codebases | | | |

Chemistry

| Title | ISSN | Launched | Impact factor |
|---|---|---|---|
| SciPost Chemistry | 2772-6762 | 2021 | 4.00 (2024) |
| SciPost Chemistry Core | | | |
| SciPost Chemistry Codebases | | | |

Political Science

| Title | ISSN | Launched | Impact factor |
|---|---|---|---|
| Migration Politics | 2949-8872 | 2022 | 3.11 (2024) |

Authors are encouraged to make use of preprint servers (for physics, the arXiv e-print archive) but can also submit directly. The recommendation of using preprints leads to SciPost often being thought of as an overlay journals system. This is incorrect since the platform self-hosts all its publishing workflows and results.

Refereeing at SciPost uses an open procedure known as peer-witnessed refereeing. Submitted manuscripts must be picked up for editorial processing by one of the Fellows of an Editorial College. Besides invited referees, registered contributors can also volunteer reports. The contents of the reports are made publicly visible (the referee can choose to remain anonymous or not). Publication decisions are taken by the Editorial College by majority voting.

Publications carry a Creative Commons license. Metadata is deposited at Crossref and at the DOAJ (all journals carry to DOAJ Seal). As a participant in the Initiative for Open Citations (I4OC), SciPost makes all its citation data open.

== Business model ==
SciPost is funded through a consortial business model whereby universities and research funding agencies worldwide contribute to pooled resources used to run operations. No article processing charges are levied. Sponsors and further benefitting organizations are publicly listed with tallies of linked publications. This data is used to suggest sponsorship levels for sustainability.

The SciPost model resembles the one used by the Open Library of Humanities and is similarly mentioned in discussions on the reform of publishing business models.

Organizations which have sponsored SciPost in its early stage include the NWO (Netherlands Organisation for Scientific Research), the University of Melbourne, the Max Planck Society / Max Planck Digital Library, the University of Amsterdam, CERN, the EPFL, Technical University of Dortmund, Vereniging van Universiteiten (VSNU), OpenAIRE, the University of Lorraine, University of Bern, the University of Queensland, the Technical University of Munich, Forschungszentrum Jülich, Johannes Kepler University Linz, Delft University of Technology, Stockholm University, VU Amsterdam, Heidelberg University, Leiden University, an Austrian national consortium led by the FWF Austrian Science Fund.

== Community feedback ==
In the context of Plan S, Robert-Jan Smits singled out SciPost and suggested classifying it as a "Rhodium" publisher. In a Nature editorial on the evolution of journals into "information platforms", SciPost was qualified as "most impressive".

== See also ==
- List of open-access journals
