= Open access in Canada =

Open access is a set of principles and a range of practices through which nominally copyrightable publications are delivered to readers free of access charges or other barriers. In Canada, open access policy has developed and expanded for nearly 20 years. The Institutes of Health Research effected a policy of open access in 2008, which in 2015 expanded to include the Natural Sciences and Engineering Research Council and Social Sciences and Humanities Research Council. In 2025, the Tri-Agency (comprising the Canadian Institutes of Health Research, Natural Sciences and Engineering Research Council, and Social Sciences and Humanities Research Council) released a draft, revised open access policy.

There are also established Canadian organizations that pursue or support open access activities. The Public Knowledge Project began in 1998 at University of British Columbia. The Canadian Research Knowledge Network was launched in 1999 (as the Canadian National Site Licensing Project), and facilitates open access to research via licensing agreements with publishers and the Partnership for Open Access (with Érudit). Érudit, a Canadian scholarly journal platform, has been operating since 1998. Together, Érudit and the Public Knowledge Project formed Coalition Publica in 2017. In 2023, the Canadian Research Knowledge Network and Canadian Association of Research Libraries released a library action plan in support of open scholarship in Canada. Notable Canadian advocates for open access include Leslie Chan, Jean-Claude Guédon, Stevan Harnad, Heather Morrison, and John Willinsky.

== Repositories ==
There are some 88 collections of scholarship in Canada housed in digital open access repositories.

== Timeline ==
- 1994 27 June: Stevan Harnad posts a Subversive Proposal calling on authors to archive their articles for free online.
- 1998: Public Knowledge Project (PKP) established by John Willinsky. French-language Érudit online publishing platform launched, as a university-based initiative with the ambition to create digital tools and offer services to scholarly journals
- 2000: PKP releases first open source software package, Open Conference Systems (OCS), which it supports until 2014
- 2002: PKP launched Open Journals Systems (OJS) as an open source journal publishing platform
- 2003: 12 Canadian universities host OA journals on their IRs (Institutional Repositories)
- 2005: SFU Dean of Libraries Lynn Copeland initiates PKP partnership with Simon Fraser University Library and the Canadian Institute for Studies in Publishing, led by Rowly Lorimer.
- 2006: November: Athabasca University begins policy encouraging deposits in its institutional repository.
- 2009 October: York University begins open access policy.
- 2014: Érudit and Canadian Research Knowledge Network launch Partnership for Open Access.
- 2015: Tri-Agency Open Access Policy on Publications (2015) released.
- 2017: Coalition Publica founded to support publishing in social sciences and humanities fields.

== See also ==
- Open data in Canada
- Open educational resources in Canada
- Science and technology in Canada
- Open access in other countries
