= OJS =

OJS may mean:

- O. J. Simpson (1947–2024)
- Open Journal Systems, journal publishing software
- ISO 639 language designation for the Oji-Cree language, also known as the Severn Ojibwa language or Anishininiimowin (Anishinini language)
