= Diamond open access =

Open access distributed with no fees to author and reader

Diamond among the different open access models

Diamond open access refers to academic texts (such as monographs, edited collections, and journal articles) published, distributed, and preserved with no fees to either reader or author. Alternative labels include platinum open access, non-commercial open access, cooperative open access or, more recently, open access commons. While these terms were first coined in the 2000s and the 2010s, they have been retroactively applied to a variety of structures and forms of publishing, from subsidized university publishers to volunteer-run cooperatives that existed in prior decades.

In 2021, it is estimated that between 17,000 and 29,000 scientific journals rely on a diamond open access model. They make up 73% of the journals registered in the Directory of Open Access Journals and 44% of the articles, as their mean output is smaller than commercial journals. The diamond model has been especially successful in Latin America-based journals (95% of OA journals) following the emergence of large publicly supported platforms, such as SciELO and Redalyc. However, Diamond OA journals are under-represented in the major scholarly databases, such as Web of Science and Scopus. It is also noteworthy, that high-income countries "have the highest share of authorship in every domain and type of journal, except for diamond journals in the social sciences and humanities".

In 2022, new national and international policies, such as the UNESCO recommendation on open science, and the Action Plan for Diamond Open Access promoted by the cOAlition S aim to support the development of non-commercial or community-driven forms of open access publishing.

== Context and definition ==
=== Historical roots of diamond models: knowledge clubs and commons ===
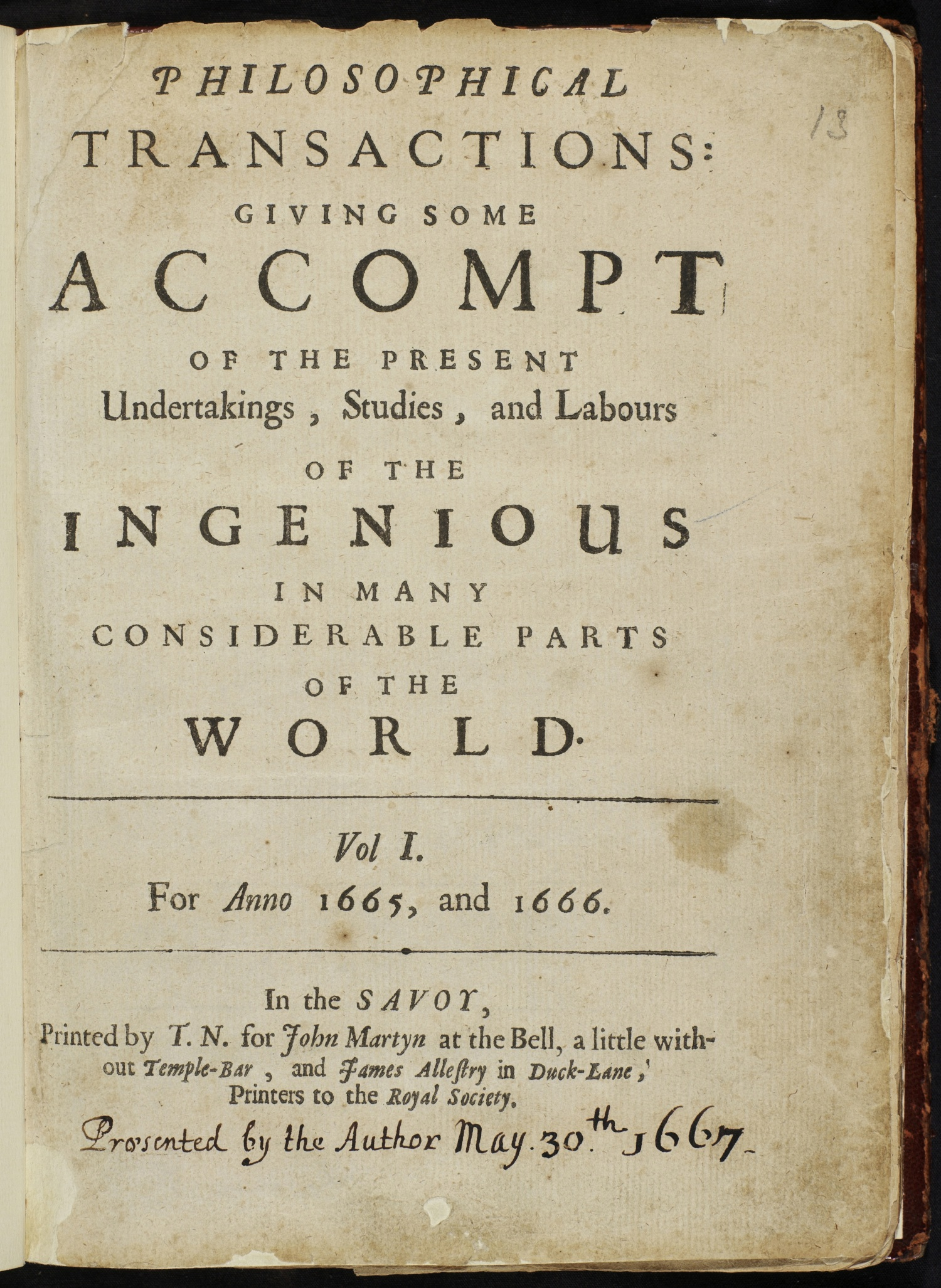
An early example of community-run journal, The Philosophical Transactions of the Royal Society

Until the Second World War, academic publishing was mostly characterized by a wide range of community-driven scholarly structures with little concern for profitability. Most journals of the 19th century and the first part of the 20th century were collective initiatives led by a scientific movement or institution that largely relied on informal community norms rather than commercial regulations. These historical practices have been described as a form of knowledge commons, or, more specifically, as a knowledge club that holds an intermediary status between a knowledge commons and a private company: while managed by a community, journals are mostly used to the benefit of a selected set of authors and readers.

In Western Europe and North America, direct ownership of journals by academic communities and institutions started to wane in the 1950s. The expansion of scientific publishing in the context of big science led to a perceived "crisis" of the historical model of scientific periodicals. Between 1950 and 1980, the new model of large commercial publishers came to dominate numerous fields of scientific publishing in western countries:

The small society presses, struggling to cope with growing scale, were supported and then largely supplanted by the 'Big 5' commercial presses: Elsevier (which acquired Pergamon in 1991), Wiley, Springer, Taylor & Francis and Sage. These newly-empowered players brought an industrial approach to the publication and dissemination process, for the first time realising the benefits that these specialised capital and skills could provide by operating at a scale that was unprecedented to that date.

This transformation had wide-ranging consequences over the way scientific journals were managed, not only at the economic but also at the editorial level with an increased standardization of publishing norms, peer-review process, or copyrights. Yet it was neither global nor general, and communal forms of journal ownership and management remained significant in large geographic areas (like Latin America) and in several disciplines, especially in the humanities and the social sciences.

=== Development of "grassroots" open access (1990–2010) ===
The open access movement emerged both as a consequence of the unprecedented access afforded by online publishing and as a reaction against the large corporate model that has come to dominate scientific publishing since the Second World War and the hyper-inflation of subscription prices. The early pioneers of open access electronic publishing were non-commercial and community-driven initiatives that built up on a trend of grassroot publishing innovation in the social sciences and the humanities:

In the late '80s and early '90s, a host of new journal titles launched on listservs and (later) the Web. Journals such as Postmodern Cultures, Surfaces, the Bryn Mawr Classical Review and the Public-Access Computer Systems Review were all managed by scholars and library workers rather than publishing professionals.

Specialized free software for scientific publishing like Open Journal Systems became available after 2000. This development entailed a significant expansion of non-commercial open access journals by facilitating the creation and the administration of journal websites and the digital conversion of existing journals. Among the journals registered in the Directory of Open Access Journals (DOAJ) without an article processing charge (APC), the number of annual creation has gone from 100 by the end of the 1990s to 800 around 2010, and has not evolved significantly since then.

=== Debates over the identity of the open access commons (2003–2012) ===
In the early debates over open access, the distinctions between commercial and non-commercial forms of scientific publishing and community-driven or corporate-owned structures seldom appear, possibly due to the lack of viable business model for open access. Open access publications were rather increasingly categorized into two different editorial forms: open access articles made immediately available by the publisher and pre-published articles hosted on an online archive (either as a pre-print or post-print). Starting in 2003, the ROMEO project started to devise a color-code system to better identify the policy of scientific publishers in regard to open sharing of scientific articles, from "yellow" (pre-print only) to "green" (no restriction in place): "the 'greenest' publishers are those that allow self-archiving not only of the author's accepted manuscript, but of the fully formatted and paginated publisher PDF". In 2004, Harnad et al. repurposed this classification scheme into a highly influential binary scale: articles directly made available by the publisher belong to "gold" open access (instead of "yellow") and online archives are defined as "green" open access. With this breakdown of open access into "green" and "gold", there is no distinction between commercial and non-commercial publishers. For Peter Suber the "gold" model embraces both journals supported by APCs or by other means of funding, as well as volunteer-run journals: "In the jargon, OA delivered by journals is called gold OA, and OA delivered by repositories is called green OA."

Tom Wilson introduced the expression "Platinum Open Access" in 2007 following a heated debate with Stevan Harnad and other open access activists on the American Scientist Open Access Forum mailing list. On his blog, Wilson defended the necessity of enlarging the classification of open access publishing forms as well as stressed the danger of conflating commercial and non-commercial open access journals.

[The "gold" and "green" classification] is not really the whole story and is in danger of perpetuating the myth that the only form of open access publishing is that made available through the commercial publishers, by author charging. This is why I distinguish between open access through author charging, which is what the Gold Route is usually promoted as being (…) and the Platinum Route of open access publishing which is free, open access to the publications and no author charges. In other words the Platinum Route is open at both ends of the process: submission and access, where as the Gold Route is seen as open only at the access end.

The term "diamond open access" was coined later in 2012 by Marie Farge, a French mathematician and physicist and open access activist. Farge was involved in the Cost of Knowledge campaign led by Timothy Gowers against the excessive cost of scientific publishing. The reference to "diamond" was a hyperbolic pun on the "gold" metaphor that aims to suggest that non-commercial/free model were ultimately the best: "I have proposed to call this third way 'Diamond OA' by outbidding the 'Gold OA' terminology chosen by the publishers". "Free OA" was also contemplated as an alternative name.

The Forum of Mathematics, an open access journals co-created by Timothy Gowers, was the first publication to explicitly claim to be a diamond journal: "For the first three years of the journal, Cambridge University Press will waive the publication charges. So for three years the journal will be what Marie Farge (who has worked very hard for a more rational publication system) likes to call diamond open access, a quasi-miraculous model where neither author nor reader pays anything".

=== Defining the diamond model (2012–present) ===
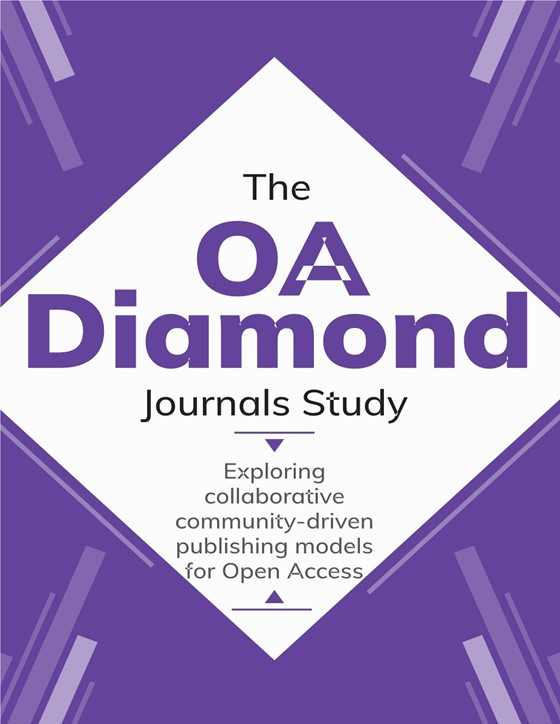
Cover of the OA Diamond Study (2021)

In 2013, Fuchs and Sandoval published one of the first systematic definitions of diamond open access: "Diamond open access Model, not-for-profit, non-commercial organizations, associations or networks publish material that is made available online in digital format, is free of charge for readers and authors and does not allow commercial and for-profit re-use." This definition is associated with a controversial stance against the leading definition of gold open access: "We argue for differentiating the concept of Gold Open Access Publishing because Suber and others mesh together qualitatively different models, i.e. for-profit and not-for-profit ones, into the same category, whereas others, especially policy makers, simply forget or exclude not-for-profit models that do not use author fees or reader fees." The debate over the relationship between "diamond" or "platinum" open access publications versus "Gold" open access has never settled and remains a point of contention, even after the publication of the OA Diamond Study. While valuing this study, Martin Paul Eve still considers diamond open access to be a "category error".

Since 2013, the theoretical literature on the diamond model has been increasingly influenced by institutional analysis of the commons. Consequently, the "Open access commons" has recently emerged has an alternative label, although the term is used less as a descriptor and more as a programmatic ideal for the future of non-commercial open access. The conclusion of the OA Diamond study calls for the realization of The OA Commons as "a diverse, thriving, innovative and more interconnected and collaborative OA diamond journal ecosystem that supports bibliodiversity and serves many languages, cultures and domains in the future.". Similarly, Janneke Adema and Samuel Moore have proposed to "redefine the future of scholarly publishing in communal settings" through a "scaling small" that ensures the preservation and development of diverse editorial models.

Analysis of the diamond model has been significantly deepened by the commission of large scale empirical studies such as the OA Cooperative Study (2016) by the Public Knowledge Project and the OA Diamond Study (2021) by the cOAlition S. Noteworthy, the 2021 study found:

1. The number of Diamond OA journals is very large (>29,000), but only ~a third are registered in DOAJ, and only ~5% are indexed in either Scopus or Web of Science. Over half of these Diamond OA journals publish 25 or fewer articles per year.
2. Between 2017 and 2019, paid-access journals published ~80% of all articles, paid-OA journals published ~11%, and Diamond OA journals published ~9%.
3. The share of Diamond OA publications among all OA journal articles peaked in 2018 and has been declining since.
4. Only 4.3% of Diamond OA journals are fully compliant with all Plan S criteria.
5. Only 55% of Diamond OA journals provide DOI numbers for their articles.
6. Only 25% of Diamond OA journals provide their content as XML or HTML (in addition to pdf).
7. Only ~ half of Diamond OA journals provide download statistics for their content.
8. 2/3 of Diamond OA journals use double-blind peer review, higher than subscription journals, which prefer single-blind peer review.
9. 25% of Diamond OA journals operated at a loss, and just over 40% reported breaking even. The rest did not know their financial status.
10. Although all Diamond OA journals rely heavily on volunteer work, they have some revenue sources, such as grants, collectively-organised funding, donations, shared infrastructure, membership fees, freemium services, etc.
11. 70% of Diamond OA journals declared operating costs below $/€10,000 per year. In contrast, before cancelling its subscription in 2012, Harvard alone paid $40,000 per year for just one (the most expensive) of Elsevier's journals.
12. The most challenging area for Diamond OA journals is indexing and content visibility in the main research databases, such as Scopus, Web of Science, and SciFinder.

== Distribution ==
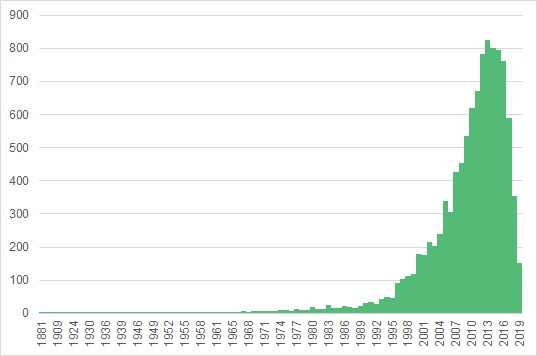
Creation date of diamond journals according to DOAJ data. The drop at the end is due to the lag of registration process to the DOAJ.

The OA Diamond Study gives an estimation of >29,000 diamond open access journals in 2021, which represent a significant share of the total number of scholarly journals. Diamond journals make up 73% of all open access journals registered on the Directory of Open Access Journals (DOAJ), with 10,194 entries out of 14,020 in September 2020. In 2013, Fuchs and Sandoval already noted that, as a far as the number of individual journals is concerned, diamond open access is the main form of open access publishing: "Diamond open access is not just an idea, but rather, as the empirical data provided in this paper shows, the dominant reality of open access."

While the diamond model is prevalent among open access journals when looking at journal titles, this is not the case when looking at the aggregate number of articles, as they publish fewer articles overall. The OA Diamond Study finds that the 10,194 journals without publication fees registered on the Directory of Open Access Journals published 356,000 articles (8–9% of all scholarly articles) per year from 2017 to 2019, compared to 453,000 articles (10–11%) published by the 3,919 commercial journals with APCs. This discrepancy can mostly be attributed to a consistently lower output from diamond open access journals compared with commercial journals: "In DOAJ we find that the majority of OA diamond journals (54.4%) publish 24 or fewer articles per year; only 33.4% of APC-based journals have a similar size." Diamond journals also have a more diverse editorial production, including other forms of scholarly productions like book reviews or editorials, which may contribute to decreasing their share of the total number of research articles.

From 2014 to 2019, the output of diamond open access journal has continued to grow in absolute terms, but has decreased relative to the output of commercial open access journals. The same period showed a significant development of APC-based large publishers as well as an increasing conversion of legacy subscription-based publishers to the commercial open access model.

Any estimation of the number of diamond journals or articles is challenging as most non-commercial or community-run journals do not identify as diamond journals and this definition has to be deduced or reconstructed from the lack of APCs or any other commercial activity. Additionally, diamond journals more frequently struggle to be registered in academic indexes and remain largely uncharted.

=== Geographic distribution ===
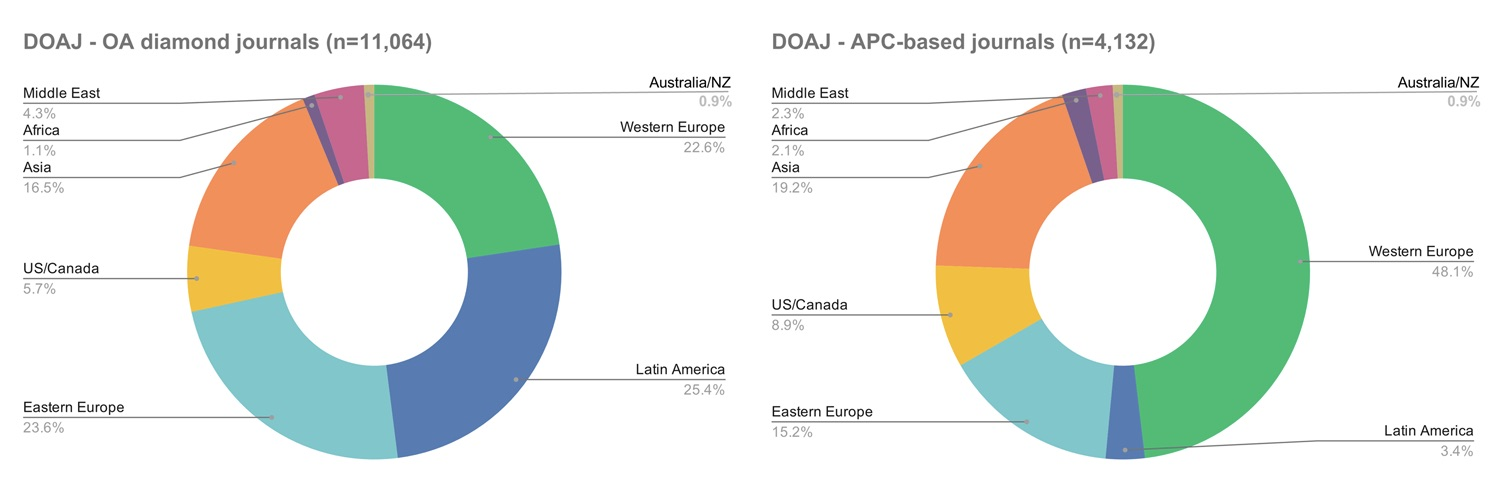
World distribution of diamond journals in the OA Diamond Study

The majority of diamond open access journals are published in Europe (around 45%) and Latin America (around 25%). In relative terms, the diamond model is especially prevalent in Latin America (95% of open access journals registered in DOAJ) and Eastern Europe (81%). In contrast with Western Europe and North America, the open access movement in Latin America was largely structured around publicly supported platforms like Redalyc or Scielo, rather than APC-based publishers:

The Latin American region, as a result, owns an ecosystem characterized by the fact that "publishing" is conceived as acts of "making public", of "sharing", rather than the activity of a profit-driven publishing industry (...) Latin American academic journals are led, owned and financed by academic institutions. It is uncommon to outsource editorial processes.

The OA Diamond Study attributes these differences to the absence of large, privately owned publishers, stating that "Most major, large commercial publishers are based in Western Europe or US/Canada, which explains some of the relative dominance of the APC-model in these regions. Without these publishers, Western Europe and US/Canada would be more similar to other regions." Additionally, Latin American journals have long been neglected in the main commercial indexes, which may have encouraged the development of local initiatives.

The diamond model has come to embody an ideal of social justice and cultural diversity in emerging and developing countries. Diamond open access journals are more likely to be multilingual (38%): "while English is the most common language [...] Spanish, Portuguese and French play a much more important role for OA diamond journals than for APC-based ones. Generally, this holds for most languages other than English."

=== Disciplines ===
While diamond OA journals are available for most disciplines, they are more prevalent in the humanities and social science. The OA Diamond Study finds that, among the journals registered on the DOAJ, humanities and social science publications make up 60% of diamond open access journals and only 23.9% of APC-based journals. This distribution may be due to the differentiated evolution of scientific publishing during the 20th century, as "small HSS journals are often owned by universities and societies who often prefer OA diamond models, while many big science and medicine journals are owned by commercial publishers, more inclined to use APC models."

However, the diamond model is still present in many disciplines, with 22.2% of diamond journals in STEM and 17.1% in Medicine. Medical diamond journals are often embedded in local communities, especially in non-western countries: "It becomes apparent that local diamond OA journals are not only important in HSS, but also in medicine."

An additional survey led by the OA Diamond Survey of 1,619 diamond OA journals highlights a more complex disciplinary distribution: although the social sciences (27.2%) and humanities (19.2%) are well represented, more than a quarter of respondents did not favor one discipline in particular (15.1% for multidisciplinary and 12% for "other").

== Organization and economics ==
The OA Diamond Study introduced a taxonomy of 6 types of diamond OA journals based largely on their ownership status: institutional journals, learned-society journals, volunteer-run journals, publisher journals, platform journals, and large journals.

Most diamond open access journals are managed by academic institutions, communities or platforms: "The majority of journals (42%) are owned by universities. The main alternatives are learned societies (14%) and, to a lesser extent, government agencies, university presses and individuals." This integration ensures the autonomy of the journals: they "are inherently independent from commercial publishers as they are not created by them and do not rely on them at the management level."

The main sources of support for diamond OA journals are non-monetary: in-kind support from research institutions (such as hosting and software maintenance or copy-editing services) and voluntary contributions. Grant funding is significantly less-mentioned in surveys, possibly because it does not always ensure a regular source of support. Since the 1990s, shared platforms have become important intermediary actors for diamond journals, especially in Latin America (Redalyc, AmeliCA, ScIELO, Ariadna Ediciones) and some European countries such as France (OpenEdition Journals, via Lodel), or the Netherlands, Finland, Croatia, and Denmark (all via PKP's Open Journal System). Since the core definition of the diamond model is focused on the lack of APCs, a few diamond journals (less than 5–10% of respondents in the OA Diamond Survey) maintain commercial activities by charging for services or additional features (freemium).

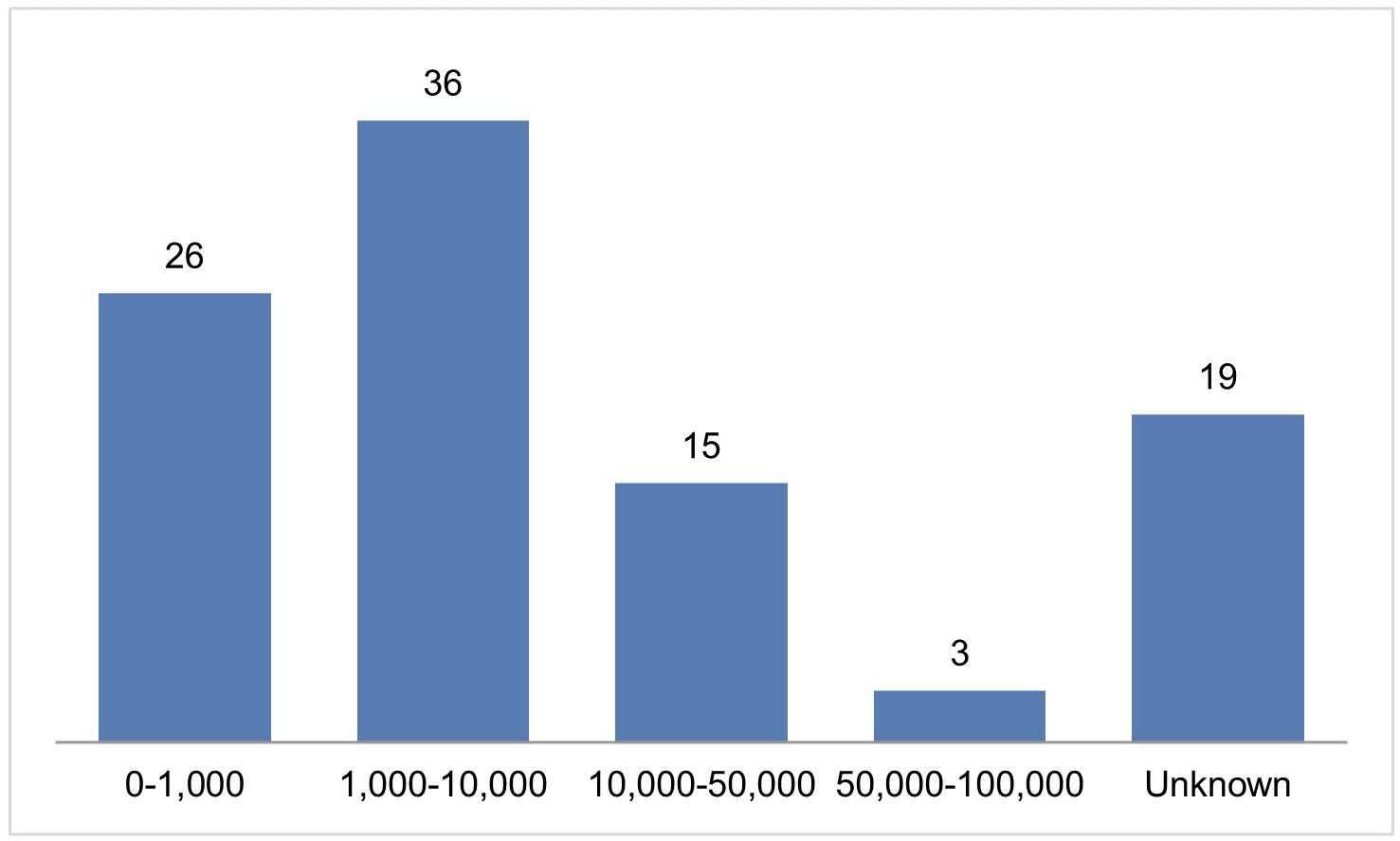
Share of journals surveyed by the OA Diamond Study that fall in a specific range of annual costs (i.e. 26% of the respondents have an annual costs between $1–$1000)

Operating costs of diamond journals are low: half of the 1,600 journals surveyed by the OA Diamond Study had costs below $/€1,000 per year. The median cost per articles is around $200, which is significantly lower than standard APCs for commercial open access journals. These low costs are accounted for by institutional support, limited expenses, and reliance on volunteer work: 60% of the journals surveyed in the OA Diamond Study were at least partly run by volunteers.

The governance models of diamond journals also have an impact on their economic models. Journals embedded in academic institutions are more like to benefit from direct funding or support, whereas "journals owned by learned societies rely significantly more on membership fees". Despite these supports, a significant number of diamond journals still lack funding for their basic operations. Finally, unlike APC-funded journals, research funding organizations tend not to support diamond OA journals, though there are proposals for new direct funding mechanisms.

== Issues and perspectives ==
=== Apparent limitations of focus ===
Recent discussions of diamond open access have taken an increasingly narrow focus, limiting the definition to mostly refer to journals, instead of the full range of academic texts.

Others argue that diamond open access should be a format-agnostic concept that can include all research outputs, including long form works like book chapters and monographs, which play an important role in the Humanities and Social Sciences.

=== Preservation ===
Long-term preservation is essential for all scholarly publications, and this is being studied for diamond open access journals. Results from a survey presented in the OA Diamond Journals Study indicate that 57% of diamond OA journals have no preservation policy. While libraries have an incentive to preserve articles published by subscription-based journals to ensure their investment is not lost, there is no similar motivation for free online content.

Efforts are underway to solve this issue, such as Project JASPER, an ongoing project of the Directory of Open Access Journals, CLOCKSS, the Internet Archive, the KEEPERS Registry, and PKP-PN; as well as the automated preservation of published articles in LOCKSS when Open Journal Systems (OJS) is used. Of the diamond journals surveyed in the OA Diamond Journals Study, 60 use this open source software application for managing and publishing.

=== Recognition ===
While diamond open access journals make up a large share of all open access publications, they have long been overlooked by scientific funding mechanisms:

This reality is however not enough acknowledged and taken into account in the open access journal debate. There is a danger that Diamond open access publishers' interests are overlooked and that a corporate model of OA will shape the future of academia. We therefore argue for a shift in the debate and that policy makers should take the Diamond Model serious by providing support for it.

The launch of the cOAlition-S initiative in 2018 made the recognition of diamond journals more pressing. Support for open access publishing would now be conditioned on adherence to a series of editorial and economic standards which some diamond journals may struggle to conform to, given their limited means. One of the final recommendations of the OA Diamond Study was a call to fully integrate Diamond journals into the Plan S strategy:

Some journals argue that research funders have the responsibility to support or even favour OA diamond journals since they are often excluded from discussions on funding OA. While, the Plan S Principle 5 states that "the Funders support the diversity of business models for Open Access journals and platforms", perceptions will change once funders focus on OA diamond in addition to Gold OA and legacy publishing. This action has a significant potential to cover existing gaps in OA publishing.

In 2020 and 2021, the institutional recognition of the diamond model has significantly progressed with unprecedented commitments from national and international organizations. The 2021 UNESCO recommendation for Open Science calls for "supporting not-for-profit, academic and scientific community-driven publishing models as a common good". The second French Plan for Open Science encouraged a "diversification of economic models" that especially highlight the diamond model as it should enable "a transition from subscription towards open access with no publishing fees". In March 2022, an Action Plan for Diamond Open Access was published with the support of the cOAlition S, Science Europe, OPERAS, and the French National Research Agency. This plan aims to "expand a sustainable, community-driven Diamond scholarly communication ecosystem." In 2024 the Toluca-Cape Town Declaration on Diamond Open Access declared that "scholarly knowledge is a public good" and that "diamond open access is driven by social justice, equity and inclusivity".

== Bibliography ==
=== OA Diamond Study & Action Plan ===
- Bosman, Jeroen; Frantsvåg, Jan Erik; Kramer, Bianca; Langlais, Pierre-Carl; Proudman, Vanessa (2021-03-09). OA Diamond Journals Study. Part 1: Findings (Report). doi:10.5281/zenodo.4558704.
- Becerril, Arianna; Bosman, Jeroen; Bjørnshauge, Lars; Frantsvåg, Jan Erik; Kramer, Bianca; Langlais, Pierre-Carl; Mounier, Pierre; Proudman, Vanessa; Redhead, Claire; Torny, Didier (2021-03-09). OA Diamond Journals Study. Part 2: Recommendations (Report). doi:10.5281/zenodo.4562790.
- Ancion, Zoé; Borrell-Damián, Lidia; Mounier, Pierre; Rooryck, Johan; Saenen, Bregt (2022-03-02). Groeneveld, Iwan (ed.). Action Plan for Diamond Open Access (Report). doi:10.5281/zenodo.6282403.

=== Book & thesis ===
- Andriesse, Cornelis D. (2008-09-15). Dutch Messengers: A History of Science Publishing, 1930-1980. Leiden; Boston: Brill. ISBN 978-90-04-17084-1.
- Bellis, Nicola De (2009). Bibliometrics and Citation Analysis: From the Science Citation Index to Cybermetrics. Lanham, Md: The Scarecrow Press, Inc. ISBN 978-0-8108-6713-0.
- Suber, Peter (2012-07-20). Open Access. MIT Press. ISBN 978-0-262-30098-8.
- Tesnière, Valérie (2021-03-17). Au bureau de la revue. Une histoire de la publication scientifique (XIXe-XXe siècle). Ecole des Hautes Etudes en Sciences Sociales.
- Wouters, P. F. (1999). The citation culture (Thesis).

=== Articles & chapters ===
- Adema, Janneke; Moore, Samuel A. (2021-03-22). "Scaling Small; Or How to Envision New Relationalities for Knowledge Production". Westminster Papers in Communication and Culture. 16 (1). doi:10.16997/wpcc.918. S2CID 233452312.
- Babini, Dominique; Machin-Mastromatteo, Juan D (2015-11-01). "Latin American science is meant to be open access: Initiatives and current challenges". Information Development. 31 (5): 477–481. doi:10.1177/0266666915601420. ISSN 0266-6669. S2CID 63645043.
- Becerril-García, Arianna; Aguado-López, Eduardo (2019-06-02). "The End of a Centralized Open Access Project and the Beginning of a Community-Based Sustainable Infrastructure for Latin America : Redalyc.org after Fifteen Years". In Leslie Chan, Pierre Mounier (ed.). Connecting the Knowledge Commons – From Projects to Sustainable Infrastructure : The 22nd International Conference on Electronic Publishing – Revised Selected Papers. Laboratoire d'idées. Marseille: OpenEdition Press. pp. 41–55. ISBN 979-10-365-3802-5.
- Contat, Odile; Torny, Didier (2015). "Les revues en sciences humaines et sociales à l'heure des communs". Revue dhistoire moderne contemporaine. 62–4 (5): 62–70. doi:10.3917/rhmc.625.0062. ISSN 0048-8003.
- Farge, Marie (2016-10-04). "Les revues académiques ne devraient plus appartenir aux maisons d'édition". I2D - Information, Donnees Documents. 53 (3): 19. doi:10.3917/i2d.163.0019. ISSN 2428-2111.
- Fuchs, Christian; Sandoval, Marisol (2013-09-09). "The Diamond Model of Open Access Publishing: Why Policy Makers, Scholars, Universities, Libraries, Labour Unions and the Publishing World Need to Take Non-Commercial, Non-Profit Open Access Serious". TripleC: Communication, Capitalism & Critique. 11 (2): 428–443. doi:10.31269/triplec.v11i2.502. ISSN 1726-670X.
- Gadd, Elizabeth; Troll Covey, Denise (2019-03-01). "What does 'green' open access mean? Tracking twelve years of changes to journal publisher self-archiving policies". Journal of Librarianship and Information Science. 51 (1): 106–122. doi:10.1177/0961000616657406. ISSN 0961-0006. S2CID 34955879.
- Harnad, Stevan; Brody, Tim; Vallières, François; Carr, Les; Hitchcock, Steve; Gingras, Yves; Oppenheim, Charles; Stamerjohanns, Heinrich; Hilf, Eberhard R. (2004). "The Access/Impact Problem and the Green and Gold Roads to Open Access". Serials Review. 30 (4): 310–314. doi:10.1080/00987913.2004.10764930. ISSN 0098-7913. S2CID 220287222.
- Johnson, Rob (2019-01-30). "From coalition to commons: Plan S and the future of scholarly communication". Insights. 32 (1) 5. doi:10.1629/uksg.453. ISSN 2048-7754. S2CID 86623783.
- Laakso, Mikael; Matthias, Lisa; Jahn, Najko (2021). "Open is not forever: A study of vanished open access journals". Journal of the Association for Information Science and Technology. 72 (9): 1099–1112. arXiv:2008.11933. doi:10.1002/asi.24460.
- Lockett, Andrew (2021-06-01). "Publishing, the Internet and the Commons: Debates and Developments". Westminster Papers in Communication and Culture. 16 (1). doi:10.16997/wpcc.1048.
- Mac Síthigh, Daithí; Sheekey, John (2012-12-15). "All That Glitters Is Not Gold, But Is It Diamond?". SCRIPTed. 9 (3): 274–279. doi:10.2966/scrip.090312.274. hdl:20.500.11820/74c5c796-3c4c-43f6-a91f-9373cef2a148. ISSN 1744-2567.
- Martin, Shawn (2019-02-28). "Historicizing the Knowledge Commons: Open Access, Technical Knowledge, and the Industrial Application of Science". KULA: Knowledge Creation, Dissemination, and Preservation Studies. 3: 23. doi:10.5334/kula.16. ISSN 2398-4112. S2CID 159112994.
- Martone, Maryann; Aghazarian, Maria (2019-06-14). "The Scholarly Commons". The Serials Librarian. 76 (1–4): 220–224. doi:10.1080/0361526X.2019.1587699. ISSN 0361-526X. S2CID 164859715.
- Meagher, Kate (2021). "Introduction: The Politics of Open Access — Decolonizing Research or Corporate Capture?". Development and Change. 52 (2): 340–358. doi:10.1111/dech.12630. ISSN 1467-7660. S2CID 234074207.
- Moore, Samuel A. (2020). "Revisiting "the 1990s debutante": Scholar-led publishing and the prehistory of the open access movement". Journal of the Association for Information Science and Technology. 71 (7): 856–866. doi:10.1002/asi.24306. ISSN 2330-1643. S2CID 159267010.
- Mounier, Pierre (2018). "'Publication favela' or bibliodiversity? Open access publishing viewed from a European perspective". Learned Publishing. 31 (S1): 299–305. doi:10.1002/leap.1194. ISSN 1741-4857. S2CID 70134960.
- Newton, Hazel; Dacos, Marin; Mounier, Pierre; Neuman, Yrsa (2014-04-08). "Snapshots of three open access business models". Insights. 27 (s1): 39–44. doi:10.1629/2048-7754.118. ISSN 2048-7754.
- Pia, Andrea E.; Batterbury, Simon; Joniak-Lüthi, Agnieszka; LaFlamme, Marcel; Wielander, Gerda; Zerilli, Filippo M.; Nolas, Melissa; Schubert, Jon; Loubere, Nicholas; Franceschini, Ivan; Walsh, Casey; Mora, Agathe; Varvantakis, Christos (2020-07-16). "Labour of Love: An Open Access Manifesto for Freedom, Integrity, and Creativity in the Humanities and Interpretive Social Sciences". Commonplace. doi:10.21428/6ffd8432.a7503356. hdl:11584/305620. S2CID 234740475.
- Potts, Jason; Hartley, John; Montgomery, Lucy; Neylon, Cameron; Rennie, Ellie (2017-01-02). "A journal is a club: a new economic model for scholarly publishing". Prometheus. 35 (1): 75–92. doi:10.1080/08109028.2017.1386949. hdl:10.1080/08109028.2017.1386949. ISSN 0810-9028. S2CID 219732359.
- Rosnay, Mélanie Dulong de; Stalder, Felix (2020-12-17). "Digital commons". Internet Policy Review. 9 (4). doi:10.14763/2020.4.1530. ISSN 2197-6775.
- Rosnay, Melanie Dulong de (2021-03-31). "Open Access Models, Pirate Libraries and Advocacy Repertoires: Policy Options for Academics to Construct and Govern Knowledge Commons". Westminster Papers in Communication and Culture. 16 (1). doi:10.16997/wpcc.913. S2CID 233593264.

=== Conference ===
- Bosman, Jeroen; Bruno, Ian; Chapman, Chris; Tzovaras, Bastian Greshake; Jacobs, Nate; Kramer, Bianca; Martone, Maryann Elizabeth; Murphy, Fiona; O'Donnell, Daniel Paul; Bar-Sinai, Michael; Hagstrom, Stephanie; Utley, Josh; Veksler, Lusia (2017-09-15). The Scholarly Commons - principles and practices to guide research communication. OSF Preprints.
- Fyfe, Aileen; Coate, Kelly; Curry, Stephen; Lawson, Stuart; Moxham, Noah; Røstvik, Camilla Mørk (2017-05-25). Untangling Academic Publishing: A history of the relationship between commercial interests, academic prestige and the circulation of research.
- Raju, Reggie (2018). From green to gold to diamond: open access's return to social justice. IFLA WLIC. Kuala Lumpur. p. 9.
- Shearer, Kathleen; Chan, Leslie; Kuchma, Iryna; Mounier, Pierre (2020-04-15). Fostering Bibliodiversity in Scholarly Communications: A Call for Action.

=== Other web sources ===
- Caraco, Benjamin (27 January 2014). "La voie diamantée du libre accès" (Billet). Le comptoir de l'accès ouvert. doi:10.58079/sh3g.
- Eve, Martin Paul (2021). "Diamond Mining". cOAlition S.
- Eve, Martin (2015-06-09). "Subscriptions no longer needed: flipping journals to Open Access while supporting existing OA publications". Impact of Social Sciences.
- "A new open-access venture from Cambridge University Press". Gowers's Weblog. 2012-07-02.
- Morrison, Heather (2020-06-26). "Knowledge and equity: analysis of three models". Sustaining the Knowledge Commons / Soutenir les savoirs communs.
- Tay, Aaron. "Why Open Access definitions are confusing".
- "Look to the commons for the future of R&D and science policy". Impact of Social Sciences. 2020-12-17.
