= Ontario Council of University Libraries =

Education organization in Toronto, Canada

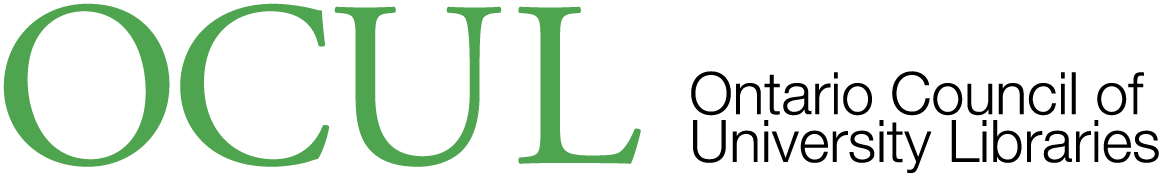
- Ontario Council of University Libraries
- Abbreviation: OCUL
- Established: 1967
- Location: Toronto, Ontario, Canada
- Region served: Ontario, Canada
- Executive Director: Amy Greenberg
- Affiliations: Council of Ontario Universities
- Website: ocul.on.ca

The Ontario Council of University Libraries (OCUL) is an academic library consortium of Ontario's 21 university libraries located in Toronto, Ontario, Canada. Formed in 1967, OCUL member institutions work together to maximize the expertise and resources of their institutions through shared services and projects. OCUL works together in a number of key areas of importance for library services, including collective content purchasing, shared digital infrastructure, external partnerships, and professional development initiatives.

OCUL is governed by the library directors of the member institutions and supported by an executive committee, made up of five officers elected from the library directors. OCUL members form working groups, committees, and communities of practice to accomplish specific tasks or projects. OCUL is an affiliate of the Council of Ontario Universities (COU).

== History ==
OCUL was founded in 1967 as the Ontario Council of University Librarians, working with the Council of Graduate Studies to ensure that graduate students and faculty members across the province had equitable access to the advanced library materials needed to support their research. The first chair of the council was Doris E Lewis. OCUL changed its name to the Ontario Council of University Libraries in 1971.

Some of OCUL's initiatives have included:

- the Inter-University Transit System (IUTS), created by OCUL in 1967 to facilitate interlibrary loans
- the Canadian University Reciprocal Borrowing Agreement (CURBA), allowing students and faculty to borrow from other Canadian universities at no cost
- the OCUL Map Group, which has been collaborating since 1973 on access to map and geospatial collections
- the Collaborative Futures Project, to facilitate collaborative management of library collections using the Ex Libris Alma platform
- making nationally significant polling data from Ipsos available freely available online

== Scholars Portal ==
Scholars Portal is the technology service arm of OCUL. Founded in 2002, they provide a variety of services for OCUL members, including e-book and journal platforms, a repository of accessible texts for university students with print disabilities, and software hosting services. In 2012, Scholars Portal won the Ontario Library Association's OLITA Project Award for the Scholars GeoPortal. In 2013, Scholars Portal was accredited as the first Trustworthy Repository in Canada.

The service provider for Scholars Portal is the University of Toronto Libraries.

== Member Institutions ==
- Algoma University
- Brock University
- Carleton University
- University of Guelph
- Lakehead University
- Laurentian University
- McMaster University
- Nipissing University
- OCAD University
- Ontario Tech University (formerly UOIT)
- University of Ottawa
- Queen's University at Kingston
- Royal Military College of Canada
- Toronto Metropolitan University (formerly Ryerson University)
- University of Toronto
- Trent University
- University of Waterloo
- Western University
- Wilfrid Laurier University
- University of Windsor
- York University

== Partnerships and memberships ==
- Public Knowledge Project (major development partner)
- Open Content Alliance
- Consortia Canada
- International Coalition of Library Consortia
- Project COUNTER
- OCLC
- Dataverse
- Portage Network, an initiative of the Canadian Association of Research Libraries
- Internet Archive (contributor)
- The Keepers Registry
