= John Willinsky =

Canadian educator and activist

John Willinsky CM FRSC
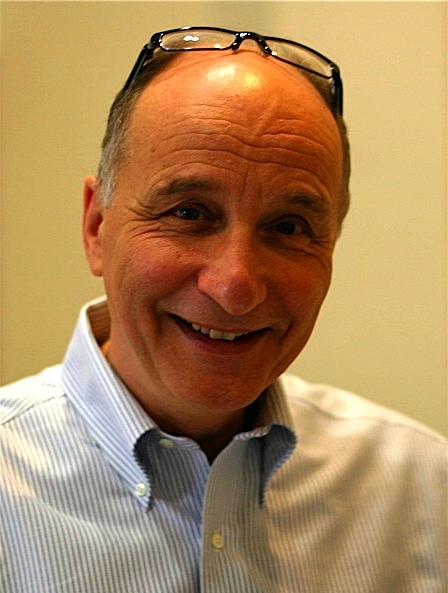
- John Willinsky
- Born: Toronto, Ontario, Canada
- Known for: Education technology, Open Access, academic scholarship
- Scientific career
- Fields: Education
- Workplaces: Stanford University, Simon Fraser University, University of British Columbia, University of Calgary

John Mark Willinsky CM FRSC (born 1950) is a Canadian-American educator, researcher, and activist. He is the Khosla Family Professor at the Stanford Graduate School of Education. He is the founder of the Public Knowledge Project, a fellow of the Royal Society of Canada, a member of the National Academy of Education. In 2025, he was appointed a Member of the Order of Canada.

== Biography ==
Born in Toronto, Ontario, Willinsky taught for the Algoma District School Board in Sault Ste. Marie, Ontario for 10 years, during which time he obtained his B.A. (Algoma University), M.Ed. (University of Toronto), and Ph.D. (Dalhousie University, supervised by Edgar Z. Friedenberg). In 1984, he joined the Faculty of Education at the University of Calgary, and in 1990 the Faculty of Education at the University of British Columbia, where he was appointed Pacific Press Professor of Literacy and Technology and Distinguished University Scholar. In 1997-98, he was the Wm. Allen (Boeing Co.) Endowed Chair of Education, Seattle University. In 2007, he was hired by the Graduate School of Education, Stanford University, and was appointed Khosla Family Professor of Education in 2008. He directed Stanford’s Science, Technology, and Society Program from 2014 to 2019. In 2022, he became Khosla Family Professor Emeritus, while being appointed professor at Simon Fraser University.

From 1993 to 1998, Vivian Forssman and Willinsky led the start-up Knowledge Architecture, on Granville Island, Vancouver, which developed the online Information Technology Management program Studio A for high school students in British Columbia and Ontario. In 1998, and informed by his research on the educational legacy of imperialism and history of publishing, he founded the Public Knowledge Project (PKP) at the University of British Columbia. In 2005, he formed a PKP partnership with Simon Fraser University.

Based on his experiences in academic publishing and his work with IT management systems, Willinsky designed a series of open source scholarly platforms for PKP including Open Conference Systems (2001, retired), Open Journals Systems (OJS; 2002), Open Monograph Press (OMP; 2013) and Open Preprint Systems (OPS; 2019). In 2022, PKP became an SFU Core Facility, while continuing its association with Stanford University. PKP systems were initially developed and continue to be upgraded by a PKP team led by Alec Smecher. Over the last two decades, OJS has grown into the world’s most widely used journal publishing platform with journals using OJS providing open access in 150 countries and 60 languages. These journals have been estimated to constitute 60% of the world’s Diamond Open Access journals (which are free for readers and authors).

Willinsky's work with PKP also includes contributing to the successful open access economic model Subscribe to Open, and developing a statutory licensing proposal for open access copyright reform (see "Books" list below). In 2024, he stepped down from the PKP leadership, which was assumed by Juan Pablo Alperin. Willinsky continues work on introducing journal publishing to Stanford University Press and developing a Publication Facts Label to build trust in research journals and articles.

Willinsky holds honorary degrees from York University (LL.D., 2008), Simon Fraser University (LL.D., 2009), and Athabasca University (DA., 2012). He has won the Connection Impact Award, Social Sciences and Humanities Research Council of Canada (2016), the Innovator Award, Scholarly Publishing and Academic Resources Coalition (2014), the Frederick G. Kilgour Award, American Library Association (2010), the Whitworth Award for Education Research, Canadian Education Association (2004), and the Wilfred R. Wees Doctoral Thesis Award, Canadian College of Teachers (1983). He has held fellowships at Dartmouth College (2005) and the Stanford Humanities Center (2013–14). From 1978 to 1980, Willinsky was a book reviewer for OPSMTF News, and from 2007 to 2025, a columnist with Slaw: Canada’s Online Legal Magazine.

Since 1998, Willinsky has served as guitarist in a number of bands, including Tony and the Hegemones, with the late Joe Kincheloe, Mayfield, Magic, and currently Baker St.

He was made a Member of the Order of Canada on December 31, 2025.

== Books ==
- Willinsky, John (2023). Copyright’s Broken Promise: How To Restore the Law’s Ability To Promote the Progress of Science. Cambridge: MIT Press. ISBN 978-0-262-37148-3
- Willinsky, John (2021). John Willinsky on Intellectual Property and Scholarly Publishing: Selected Slaw Columns From 2012-2021. Ottawa: Canadian Legal Information Institute.
- Willinsky, John (2017). The Intellectual Properties of Learning: A Prehistory From Saint Jerome to John Locke. Chicago: University of Chicago Press. ISBN 978-0-226-48792-2
- Willinsky, John (2006). The Access Principle: The Case for Open Access to Research and Scholarship. Cambridge, MA: MIT Press. Published in Chinese by Wu Nan. ISBN 978-0-262-51266-4
  - Blackwell’s Scholarship Award from the American Library Association.
  - Computers and Composition Distinguished Book of the Year Award.
- Willinsky, John (2001). After Literacy: Essays. New York: Peter Lang. ISBN 978-0-820-45242-5
- Willinsky, John (2000). If Only We Knew: Increasing the Public Value of Social Science Research. New York: Routledge. ISBN 978-1-135-95873-2
- Willinsky, John (1999). Technologies of Knowing: A Proposal for the Human Sciences. Boston: Beacon. ISBN 978-0-807-06106-0
- Willinsky, John (1998). Learning To Divide the World: Education at Empire’s End. Minneapolis: Minnesota University Press. ISBN 978-0-816-63077-6
  - Outstanding Book Award, American Educational Research Association.
  - Outstanding Book Award, History of Education Society (US).
- Willinsky, John (1994). Empire of Words: The Reign of the OED. Princeton: Princeton University Press. ISBN 978-1-400-81866-2
  - Choice’s Best Academic Books of 1995.
- Willinsky, John (1991). The Triumph of Literature/The Fate of Literacy: Teaching English in The High School. New York: Teachers College Press. ISBN 978-0-807-73108-6
- Willinsky, John (1990). The New Literacy: Redefining Reading and Writing in the Schools. New York: Routledge. Re-issued in 2017 as a Routledge Paperbacks Direct. ISBN 978-0-815-37384-1
- Willinsky, John (1988). The Well-Tempered Tongue: The Politics of Standard English in the High School. New York: Teachers College Press (originally with Peter Lang Publishing, NY, 1984). ISBN 978-0-820-40108-9

Note. Any open access editions of the above works are listed in the "External links" section below.

== See also ==
- Open Access movement
