= DPubS =

DPubS (Digital Publishing System), developed by Cornell University Library and Penn State University Libraries, is a free open access publication management software. DPubS arose out of Project Euclid, an electronic publishing platform for journals in mathematics and statistics. DPubS is free software released under Educational Community License.

== History ==
Cornell University Library has been involved in digital publishing dates since the 1980s. In partnership with the Xerox Corporation and the Commission on Preservation and Access, Cornell developed an early digital imaging project to preserve books in a fragile condition. Initially focused upon republishing mathematics titles, this effort expanded to include projects in agricultural history, home economics and American studies.

The Serials crisis in the 1980s and 1990s likely encouraged Cornell University Library and other academic libraries and institutions to investigate such possibilities. In the 1980s libraries noticed that their journal subscription prices were increasing alarmingly. By the early 1990s, many solutions were being explored, with cancellations being significant among them; in one case, LSU cancelled $650,000 in subscriptions in 1992-93. Other alternatives emerged, however, involving the use of new technologies – such as those that enabled Cornell's digital imaging project – and the increasing availability of the Internet.

One such method of increasing access, Project MUSE, was initiated by Johns Hopkins University Press. Initially, Project Muse was intended to allow electronic access to titles published by Johns Hopkins University Press, but it has expanded to include the “full text of more than 300 journals from 60 different publishing groups worldwide." Another such project, developed by Cornell University Library and influenced by Project Muse, is Project Euclid, an electronic gathering of mathematics and statistics journals. As of 2005 it was delivering “40 journals to libraries and individuals under subscription, hosting, or open access delivery plans." Project Euclid was developed out of the code used to create NCSTRL, “a distributed network of Computer Science technical reports” in Cornell's Computer Science department. It offers an opportunity for “low-cost independent and society journals” to take advantage of the benefits of inclusion in an online database “without sacrificing their intellectual or economic independence or commitment to low subscription prices." Several pricing options are available: Euclid Prime (EP), Euclid Select (ES), Euclid Direct (ED), and Open Access (OA).

Developed with two grants from The Andrew W. Mellon Foundation, Project Euclid, named after ancient mathematician Euclid of Alexandria, launched in 2003. As did their experience developing the digital imaging project, Project Euclid afforded Cornell University Library the opportunity to learn. Specifically, the library aimed to discover as much about functioning as a digital press that it was previously unfamiliar with, such as “marketing or handling subscription requests . . . editorial management procedures and the ability to negotiate contracts with journal owners." While Euclidreported as “healthy and growing” in early 2006 – Cornell's heavy investment in the project and the ever-changing nature of the academic journal field where “sustainability is a moving target” has led to the exploration of other publishing avenues.

Another initiative with relevance to the development of DPubS, arXiv, came to Cornell along with its initial developer Paul Ginsparg in 2001. Institutional repositories, which serve as a central database of scholarly work such as preprints and postprints of journal articles, have become increasingly popular: OpenDOAR, an online directory of open access repositories, has shown an increase from 350 to 850 repositories included in its database since mid-2006. Use of arXiv has been described as “intense,” averaging about 4,000 submissions per month in 2005. Though many repositories – including all of those listed in OpenDOAR – are open access, they “have not substituted for traditional publications, and thus have not had a substantial impact on the journals pricing situation." However, the success of open access repositories such as arXiv could indicate a growing willingness on the part of scholars to make use of non-traditional methods of publishing for their work.

Apart from Cornell's own desire to inquire further into unconventional approaches to publishing, there was an additional motivator. One of the results of the release of Project Euclid was interest in the software used to produce it. Cornell decided that they would eventually release this software, renaming it DPubS, but that it needed further development in order to be utilized by others. It was in 2004 that the Pennsylvania State University Libraries became involved – expressing interest in the software that was used to develop Project Euclid – and the first project in developing DPubS was making available the journal Pennsylvania History: A Journal of Mid-Atlantic Studies. This journal has been published since 1934 and is an official publication of the Pennsylvania Historical Association (PHA).

The software was last updated on 2013-04-02.

== Goals ==
Also in 2004, Terry Ehling, the Director of the Center for Innovative Publishing at Cornell University Library addressed four goals for developing the software used to create Project Euclid into DPubS. These goals included: broadening the software's applicability by expanding its flexibility, including improving its ability to be used for monographs and other “non-serial literature”; “provide on-line editorial management services to support ‘peer review’ activities”; further developing “the administrative functionality and interface”; and “provide interoperability with institutional repository systems." Furthermore, the DpubS website states the following as the development goals of Cornell University Library and Penn State University Libraries: “generalizing the platform beyond a single discipline and document format (serials); adding administrative interfaces for non-technical staff; allowing a level of interoperability between DPubS and institutional repository systems, specifically Fedora and DSpace and developing editorial services to support the peer review process.”

DPubS has been designed with the opinion that “libraries should get involved in publishing." As mentioned above, the traditional model of journal publication and the dissemination of scholarly information has been through those titles published by commercial publishers. Furthermore, due to issues of profitability, an increasing amount of scholarship does not get printed. Over time, the reputations of scholars have become strongly linked with the appearance of their work in these journals to the exception of publications outside of the commercial realm. Some groups of scholars initially reacted to Project Euclid in a “skittish” manner due to concerns over the unfamiliar nature of its model. The creators of DPubS believe that libraries are uniquely positioned to play an important role in shifting the status quo, and that efforts such as Project Muse, Project Euclid, arXiv, DPubS and other endeavors represent the kind of efforts that can be made by libraries and university presses to combat the challenges rising journal prices have presented to their budgets.

DPubS aims to contain the “cycle of knowledge creation and dissemination . . . within the academy and its close collaborators” in order to have a significant impact on academic publishing. The program “encourage[s]” libraries to take up a new role with new responsibilities in order to combat some of the print-leaning developments in the accessibility of scholarship over the past several decades. Its developers hope it will help to increase access through electronic publishing by offering for free software that could easily cost six figures “for the initial licensing."

== Features ==
After two years of development, DPubS was released in November 2006, also thanks to a grant from the Andrew W. Mellon Foundation. Its user interface utilizes XML (Extensible Markup Language) and XSLT (eXtensible Style Sheet Language Transformations), which enable adjustment for the design of web appearance for publications supported by DPubS. Additionally, it has the following features: “scalable, single platform for electronic publishing,” allowing for the publication of several formats from one place; “rich presentation features,” due to the inclusion of XML; “multiple business models,” allowing both publications that are open access and those that are fee-based to utilize the software; “greater exposure and visibility of publications,” due to the use of OAI-MHP 2.0 (Open Access Initiative Metadata Harvesting Protocol) to allow metadata to be harvested from the content supported by DPubS and shared with users through services such as Google Scholar; “administrative management tools for non-technical staff”; “interoperability with institutional repositories” such as Fedora and DSpace (the latter forthcoming as of April 2007); “flexible and extensible handling of file and metadata formats,” allowing the easy use of PDFs, HTML, Microsoft Word files, PowerPoint presentations, etc.; and a “modular architecture allowing easy extension and customization. As intended, the software used to develop Project Euclid has been expanded in order to encompass non-journal publications such as books and conference proceedings. The DpubS software can also be adapted in order to be used with other formats. This aspect of DpubS results from its open-source nature, meaning that the software’s coding has been made available, enabling programmers to develop additions and modifications of the software for their own and others purposes. While the administrative tools have been included, the editorial management services will wait for “future releases.”

Towards the goal of further development, Cornell University Library and The Pennsylvania State University Libraries has partnered with several institutions that will be using DPubS and providing feedback. As of April 2007, these partners were: Australian National University, Bielefeld University – Germany, University of Kansas, University of Utah, University of Wisconsin–Madison, and Vanderbilt University. Along with Pennsylvania History mentioned above, other journals being supported by DPubS include: Medieval Philosophy and Theology, “a semi-annual, peer-reviewed journal . . . of medieval philosophy, including logic and natural science, and in medieval theology, including Christian, Jewish, and Islamic”; Indonesia, “a semi-annual journal published by the Cornell Southeast Asia Program . . . of Indonesia’s culture, history, government, economy, and society from 1966 to the present”; and Cornell Technical Reports and Papers, “a collection of publications from the Cornell Theory Center, the Cornell Computer Science Department, and other departments and units."

== See also ==
- EPrints
- Open Journal Systems – a similar system
- OpenACS
