= Project Euclid =

Platform for open-access scholarly content

Project Euclid is a collaborative partnership between Cornell University Library and Duke University Press which seeks to advance scholarly communication in theoretical and applied mathematics and statistics through partnerships with independent and society publishers. It was created to provide a platform for small publishers of scholarly journals to move from print to electronic in a cost-effective way.

Through a combination of support by subscribing libraries and participating publishers, Project Euclid has made 70% of its journal articles available as open access. As of 2010, Project Euclid provided access to over one million pages of open-access content.

== Mission and goals ==
Project Euclid's stated mission is to advance scholarly communication in the field of theoretical and applied mathematics and statistics. Through a "mixture of open access, subscription, and hosted subscription content it provides a way for small publishers (especially societies) to host their math or statistics content".

== History ==
In 1999, Cornell University Library received a grant from the Andrew W. Mellon Foundation for the development of an online publishing service designed to support the transition for small, non-commercial mathematics journals from paper to digital distribution. Duke University Press, which had experience in putting its own math journals online and a similar interest in assisting non-commercial math journals, worked as Cornell's partner in developing the grant application and then in developing Project Euclid's publishing model.

Cornell launched Project Euclid in May 2003 with nineteen journals. In July 2008, Cornell University Library and Duke University Press established a joint venture and began co-managing Project Euclid. Duke assumed responsibility for "marketing, financial, and order fulfillment workflows" while Cornell continued to provide and support Project Euclid's IT infrastructure.

Currently, Project Euclid hosts both open access journals and monographs, as well as its Prime collection of peer-reviewed titles. Currently, there are over 60 journal titles from the United States, Japan, Europe, Brazil, and Iran. Euclid’s holdings as of February 2012 include: 110,400 journal articles from 64 titles, 162 monographs, and 23 conference proceedings volumes.

In 2011, Project Euclid received the 2011 Division Award from the Physics-Astronomy-Mathematics Division of the Special Libraries Association. Given annually, this award recognizes significant contributions to the literature of physics, mathematics, or astronomy, and honors work that demonstrably improves the exchange of information within these three disciplines. The award also takes into consideration projects that benefit libraries.

== See also ==
- DPubS
- D-Scribe Digital Publishing
