= Article processing charge =

Fee charged by some scholarly publication services

An article processing charge (APC), also known as a publication fee, is a fee which is sometimes charged to authors. Most commonly, it is involved in making an academic work available as open access (OA), in either a full OA journal or in a hybrid journal. This fee may be paid by the author, the author's institution, or their research funder. Sometimes, publication fees are also involved in traditional journals or for paywalled content. Some publishers waive the fee in cases of hardship or geographic location, but this is not a widespread practice. An article processing charge does not guarantee that the author retains copyright to the work, or that it will be made available under a Creative Commons license.

== Background ==
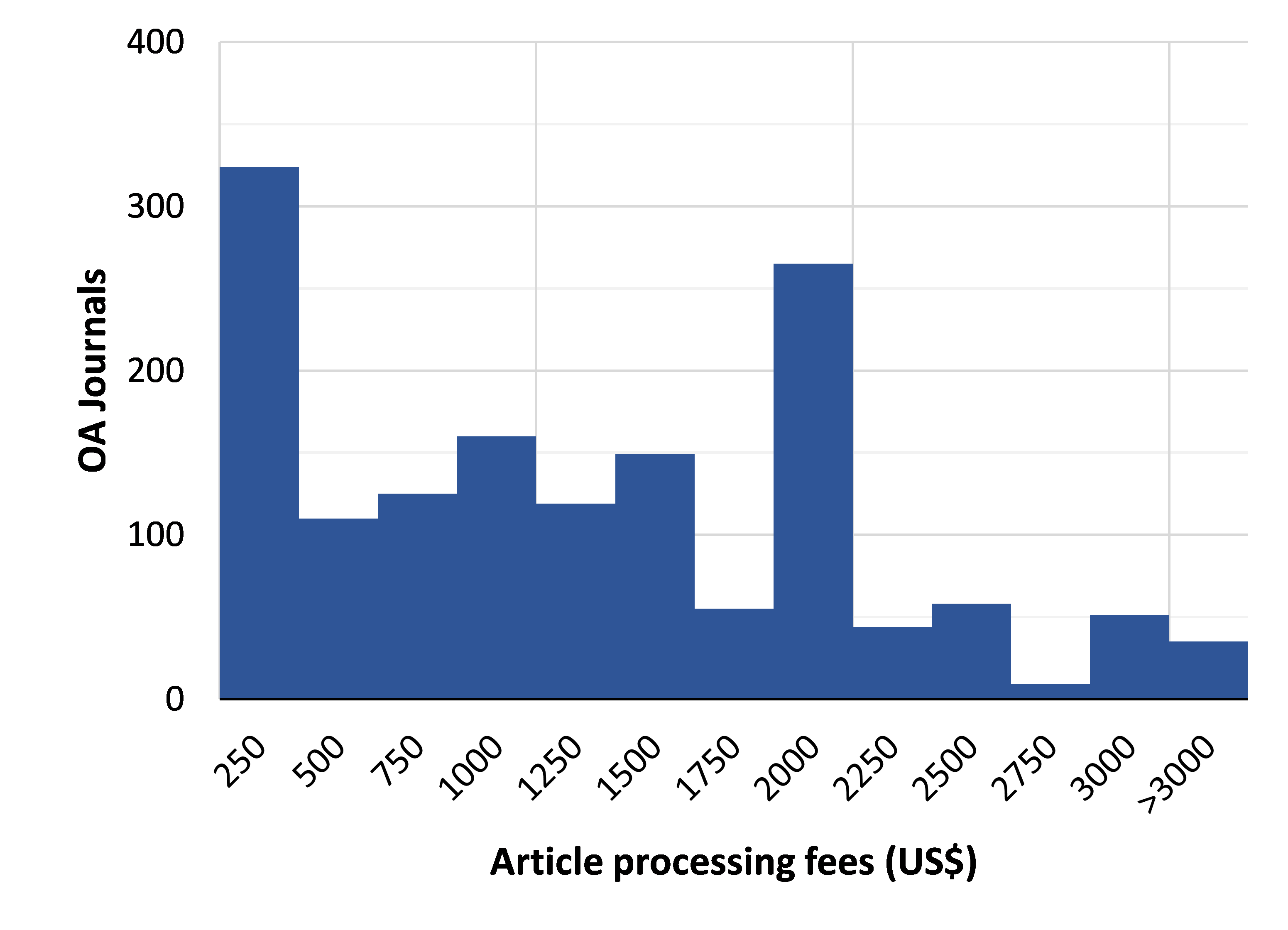
Article processing fees for journals indexed in the Directory of Open Access Journals (2019).

Journals use a variety of ways to generate the income required to cover publishing costs (including editorial costs, any costs of administering the peer review system), such as subsidies from institutions and subscriptions. A majority of open access journals do not charge article processing charges, but a significant and growing number of them do. They are the most common funding method for professionally published open access articles.

APC fees applied to academic research are usually expensive, effectively limiting open access publishing to wealthier institutions, scholars, and students.

The APC model of open access, among other controversies, is part of the wider and increasingly global Open Access OA's ethics debate.

Most journals do not charge APCs. The global average per-journal APC is US$1,626, its recent increase indicating "that authors choose to publish in more expensive journals".

A 2019 analysis has shown 75% of European spending on scientific journals goes to "big five" publishers (Elsevier, Springer Nature, Wiley, Taylor & Francis and the American Chemical Society (ACS)). Together they accounted for 56% of articles published.

== Other publishing fees ==
Author fees or page charges have existed since at least the 1930s. Different academic publishers have widely varying levels of fees, from under $100 to over $5000, and even sometimes as high as €9500 ($10851) for the journal Nature. Meanwhile, an independent study indicated that the actual costs of efficiently publishing a scholarly article should be in the region of €200–€1000. High fees are sometimes charged by traditional publishers in order to publish in a hybrid open access journal, which make an individual article in a subscription journal open access. The average APC for hybrid journals has been calculated to be almost twice as high as APCs from full open access publishers. Journals with high impact factors from major publishers tend to have the highest APCs.

Open access articles often have a surcharge compared to closed-access or paywalled content; for example, the Proceedings of the National Academy of Sciences charges $1590–$4215 per article (depending on length) for closed-access, with a surcharge of $1700–$2200 for open-access (depending on licence). Similarly, AGU's Journal of Geophysical Research charges $1000 for closed-access and $3500 for open-access.

Even when publishers do not charge standard fees, excess or overlength fees might still apply after a certain number of pages or publication units is exceeded; additional color fees might apply for figures, primarily for print journals that are not online-only.

While publication charges occur upon article acceptance, article submission fees are charged prior to the start of peer review; they are common among journals in some fields, e.g., finance and economics. Page charge may refer to either publication or submission fees.

== Criticism ==
=== Cost of research articles ===
==== Cost to scientists and funding bodies ====
Article processing charges shift the burden of payment from readers to authors (or their funders), which creates a new set of concerns. One concern is that if a publisher makes a profit from accepting papers, it has an incentive to accept anything submitted, rather than selecting and rejecting articles based on quality. This could be remedied, however, by charging for the peer-review rather than acceptance. Another concern is that institutional budgets may need to be adjusted in order to provide funding for the article processing charges required to publish in many open access journals (e.g. those published by BioMed Central). It has been argued that this may reduce the ability to publish research results due to lack of sufficient funds, leading to some research not becoming a part of the public record.

Another concern is the redirection of money by major funding agencies such as the National Institutes of Health and the Wellcome Trust from the direct support of research to the support of open access publication. Robert Terry, Senior Policy Advisor at the Wellcome Trust, has said that he feels that 1–2% of their research budget will change from the creation of knowledge to the dissemination of knowledge.

Research institutions could cover the cost of open access by converting to an open access journal cost-recovery model, with the institutions' annual tool access subscription savings being available to cover annual open access publication costs. A 2017 study by the Max Planck Society estimates the annual turnovers of academic publishers amount to approximately €7.6 billion. It is argued that this money comes predominantly from publicly funded scientific libraries as they purchase subscriptions or licenses in order to provide access to scientific journals for their members. The study was presented by the Max Planck Digital Library and found that subscription budgets would be sufficient to fund the open access publication charges, but does not address how unaffiliated authors or authors from institutions without funds will contribute to the scholarly record.

Five large commercial publishers (Elsevier, Sage, Springer Nature, Taylor & Francis, and Wiley) have raised concerns within research community. These concerns stem primarily from two factors: the publishers' substantial profit margins, which are often derived from works funded by public research grants, and the high costs associated with their open access publishing fees under gold and hybrid journal models. For example, a Guardian article informed that in 2010, Elsevier's scientific publishing arm reported profits of £724 million on just over £2 billion in revenue. The margin was 36%, which exceeded the margins reported by Apple, Google, and Amazon that same year.

==== Unequal access to publishing ====
Unless discounts are available to authors from countries with low incomes, or external funding is provided to cover the cost, article processing charges can exclude authors from developing countries or less-funded research fields from publishing. Publishers often explain this charge by citing the cost of producing print materials, but some digital-only publications continue to charge article processing fees, which has garnered criticism from academics. Under the traditional model, the prohibitive costs of some non-open access journal subscriptions already place a heavy burden on the research community. Many open access publishers do offer discounts or publishing fee waivers to authors from developing countries or those suffering financial hardship.

For these reasons, some funding bodies simply will not pay the extra fees for open access publishing: the European Union scientific research initiative Horizon Europe does not cover the APCs for articles in hybrid open-access journals.

=== Diamond open access model ===
Diamond open access is a term used to describe journals that have no article processing charges, and make articles available to read without restrictions. In 2020, diamond OA journals comprised 69% of the journals in the Directory of Open Access Journals, but published only 35% of the articles. In 2021, it was estimated that 17,000 to 29,000 diamond OA journals published 8–9% of all scholarly journal articles and 45% of open access articles. Nearly all Latin American OA journals use the diamond model, whereas a little over half of African and Western European OA journals are diamond OA. However, the percentage of diamond OA articles covered in Scopus and Web of Science for the same year was below 1%, suggesting that "Scopus- or Web of Science-based (data) are skewed towards toll access and article processing charges-based publishing, as Diamond journals are underrepresented in (these databases)". The same study also found that diamond OA articles comprised 81% of all OA articles in Humanities, but only 30% in Medicine and Sciences.

== See also ==
- Copyright transfer agreement
- Royalty-free
- Royalty payment
- Predatory publishing
- Academic journal publishing reform
- Plan S
