= Robert-Jan Smits =

Dutch administrator

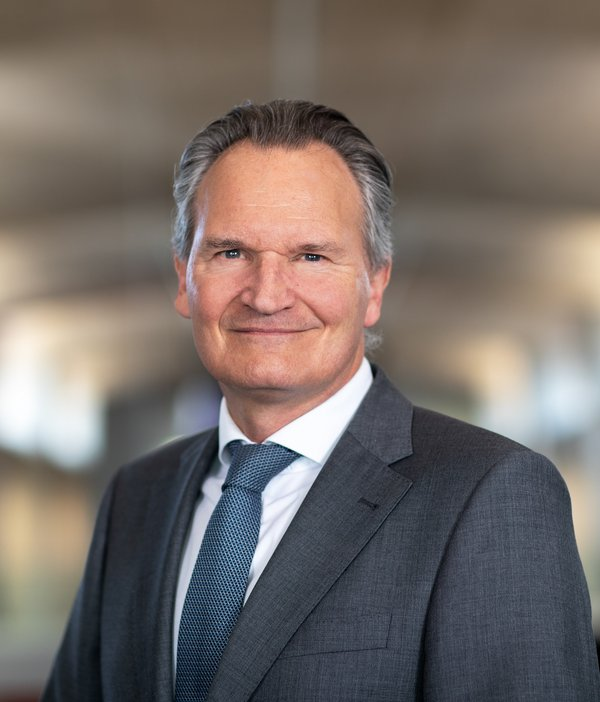
Robert-Jan Smits, president of the board of Eindhoven University of Technology

Robert-Jan Smits (born 1958) has been the President of the executive board of the Eindhoven University of Technology in the Netherlands since May 2019.

In 2018–2019, he was a senior adviser for open access and innovation at the European Political Strategy Centre and from 2010 to 2018, he served as Director-General of Research and Innovation (RTD) at the European Commission.

Smits was involved in the creation of the large-scale research and development program Horizon 2020. This was a grant program from 2014 to 2020 with a budget of nearly €80 billion to stimulate research and innovation within the EU.

Smits supported the realization of Europe's Plan S, to ensure that all publicly funded scientific publications are available in Open Access by 2020. The scientific journal Nature calls him in Nature's 10 "the architect of this year's bold push to get rid of paywalls in science publishing."

== Education and early career ==
Robert-Jan Smits was born in 1958 in the Netherlands. He has degrees from Utrecht University in the Netherlands, Graduate Institute of International and Development Studies in Switzerland, and Fletcher School of Law & Diplomacy in the United States.

Following his studies, Smits worked for the Dutch Ministry of Economic Affairs from 1985 to 1989, and left in 1989 to work at the European Commission.

== Time at the European Commission ==
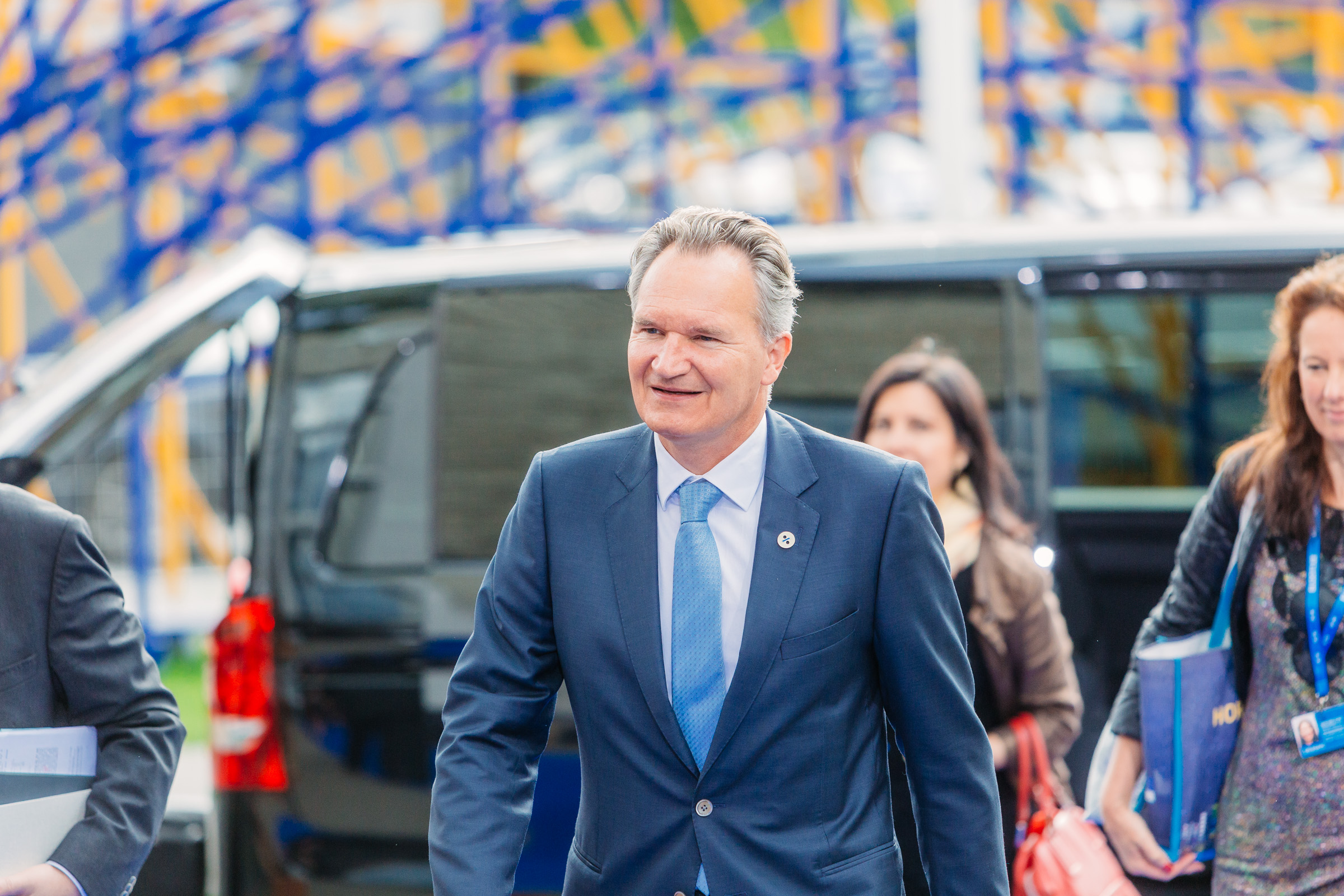
Robert-Jan Smits, as Director General of the European Commission

From July 2010 to February 2018, Smits served as the Director-General for Research and Innovation (RTD) at the European Commission. As the director-general, he was responsible for defining and implementing EU policies and programs in the field of research and innovation.

Smits is considered one of the main architects of Horizon 2020, an EU Research and Innovation program providing €80 billion of funding between 2014 and 2020. This program was succeeded by Horizon Europe (with a budget of €95 billion).

In addition, Smits was closely involved in the development of the European Research Council, the European Research Area, and the European Strategy Forum on Research Infrastructures.

== Plan S and Open Access ==
In 2018, his final year in Brussels, Smits served as the European Commission's Open Access Envoy. His role was to ensure that academic publications that result from publicly funded research are widely available and accessible via open access. Later that year, this culminated in Plan S. With Plan S, Smits wanted research funded with public money to be made readily available without paywalls or embargoes. In 2022, he and Rachael Pells published the book ‘Plan S: Science, Shock, Solution’.

In an interview, Smits explains why he considers open access so important: "Open access stimulates innovation. The immediate release of publications and data regarding COVID-19 is proof of this: it has helped enormously in the quick development of vaccines and treatments. We also have a responsibility to developing countries, for instance, which need to be able to build up a knowledge economy."

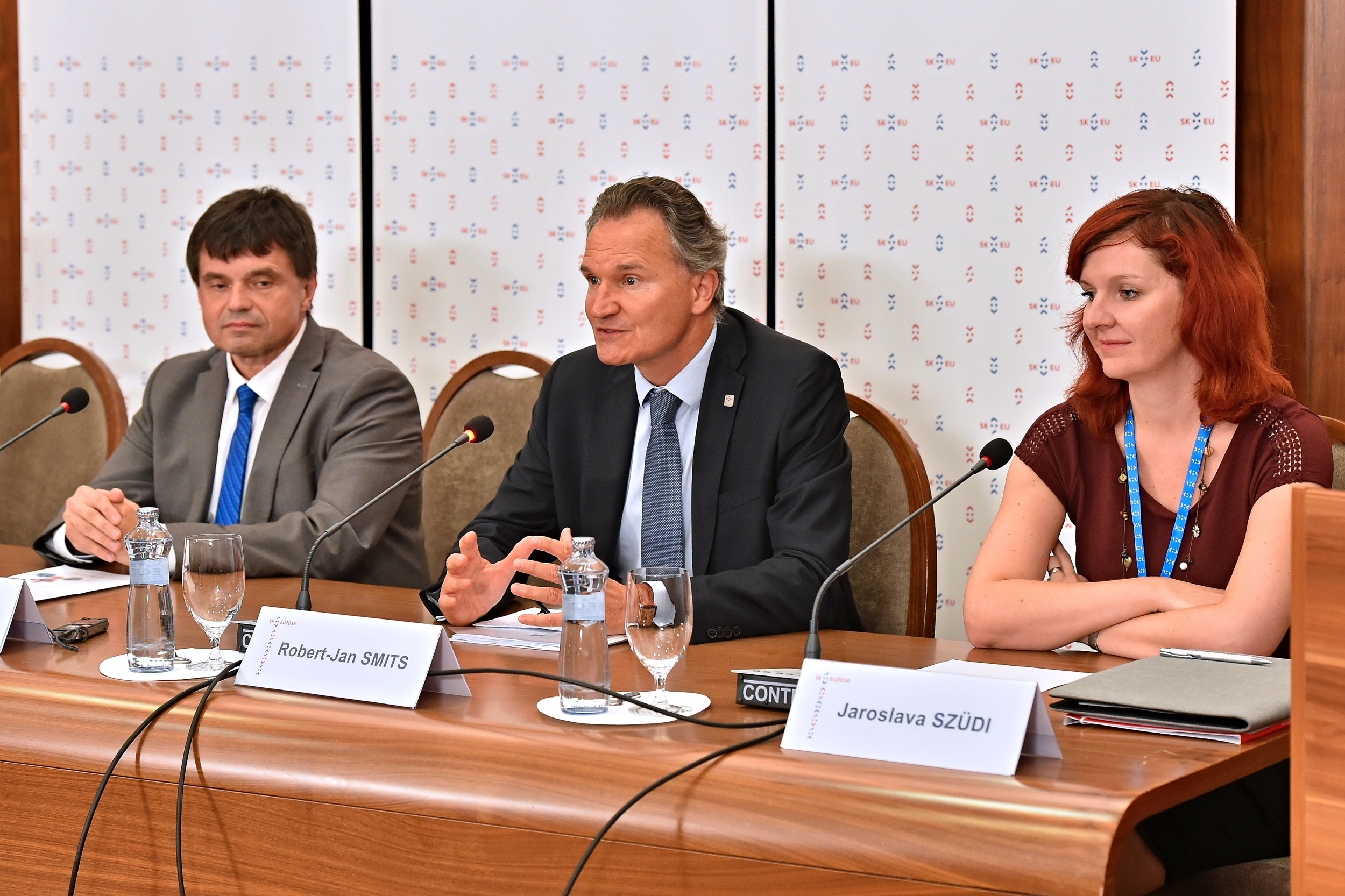
Ministerial Conference on the European Cooperation in Science and Technology (COST) (second from the right)

By now, 11 national funding agencies in Europe, who collectively spend €7.6 billion in research grants per year, have signed up to Plan S.

== President of the TU/e Executive Board ==
As president of the TU/e executive board, Smits has been committed to his university's collaborations with industrial partners since the start. In his own words: "It’s good for our researchers and students, for industry, and for society because the research done here can be brought to society faster thanks to that collaboration."

In 2023, he was reappointed for a second term.

In May 2024, he signed a collaboration agreement with ASML on behalf of TU/e. At €80 million, this is TU/e's largest ever industry-academia collaboration.

Smits has focused further on joining forces within research on multidisciplinary themes. Under his leadership, institutes arose in the fields of artificial intelligence (EAISI), renewable energy (EIRES) and quantum and photonics (Eindhoven Hendrik Casimir Institute).

== Issues ==
In July 2019, shortly after Smits began as president at TU/e, the university's administration introduced a new personnel policy aimed at attracting more female scientists. Under this program, vacancies were open solely to female scientists for the first six months of recruitment. This Irène Curie Fellowship program generated widespread discussion and led to a case before the Netherlands Institute for Human Rights. This institute ruled that TU/e could continue the program following a few adjustments. The five-year evaluation showed that the university had achieved a shift in intake from 30 to 70% female/male to 50-50% thanks to the program. In 2021, the Dutch university received the LNVH Medal from the Dutch Network of Women Professors (LNVH) for the program.

In May 2023, Smits was criticized for physically removing student climate activists engaged in an occupation of two meeting rooms on campus and that were seeking, among other demands, that the university cut its ties with fossil fuel producers and increased transparency about the university's commercial collaborations. GroenLinks and Party for the Animals members of the Eindhoven municipal council questioned Smits' physical intervention and mentioned a previous incident in March 2022 when police had "disproportion[ately] and unlawful[ly]" intervened in a previous student climate protest.

== Awards and honors ==
- KNAW Academy Medal (2016). This award is given to a person who has made a significant contribution to (the advancement of) science in the Netherlands in the broadest sense. The jury wrote that Smits has been uniquely committed to the European research landscape for his entire career. He is a kind of traffic controller at the intersection of four roads: Dutch science, European science, Dutch politics and European politics.
- Honorary degree from the University of Edinburgh (2016)
- Lifetime achievements award from EuroScience (2016)
- Excellence in Global Science award in South-Africa (2017)
- Nature's 10 (2018)
- Medal of Honor from KU Leuven (2018)
- Officer of the Order of Orange-Nassau (2025)

== Writings ==
- Plan S for shock (with Rachael Pells)

== See also ==
- Plan S
