= Open Journal Systems =

Journal management and publishing system

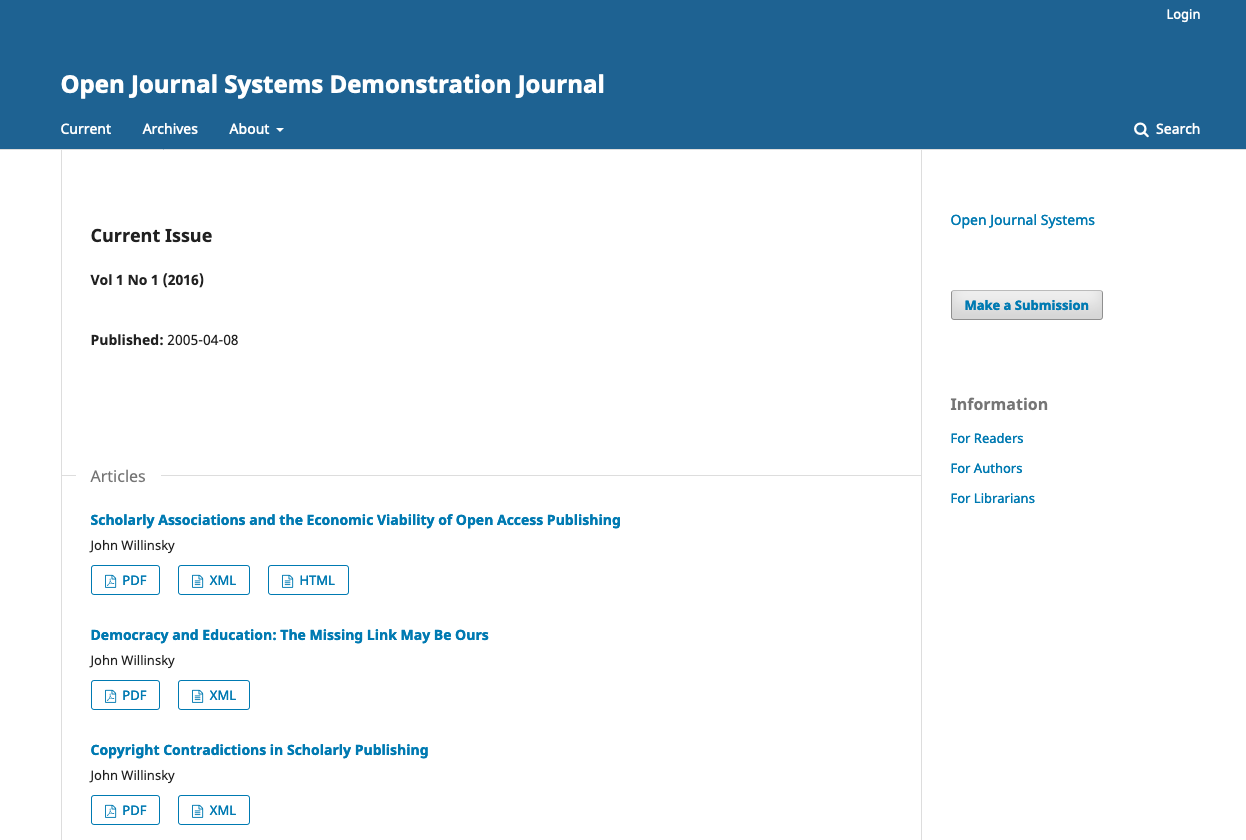
- OJS version 3
- Developer: Public Knowledge Project
- Operating system: Cross-platform
- Platform: PHP
- Available in: Multilingual
- Type: Open access publishing
- License: GNU General Public License
- Website: http://pkp.sfu.ca/ojs
- Repository: github.com/pkp/ojs

Open Journal Systems (OJS) is an open source and free software for the management of peer-reviewed academic journals, created by the Public Knowledge Project, and released under the GNU General Public License.

== History ==
Open Journal Systems (OJS) was conceived to facilitate the development of open access, peer-reviewed publishing, providing the technical infrastructure for the presentation of journal articles along with an editorial-management workflow, including article submission, peer-review, and indexing.

Like other community-based projects such as WordPress, the software has a plugin architecture, which allows new features to be integrated without changing its core codebase. Available plugins facilitate indexing in Google Scholar and PubMed Central, publishing RSS/Atom web syndication feeds, and providing COUNTER statistics about online usage, several plugins are curated and directly available for download through its plugin gallery interface. OJS is also LOCKSS-compliant, which helps ensure ongoing access to journal contents. OJS also provides custom themes, which might be added to the installation through its plugin gallery and a demo installation to experiment its features.

== Versions ==
OJS is currently in its 3.5 version, released in 2025. Its first version was released in 2001. The development roadmap is open to the public as are a set of milestones.

The software is written in PHP, currently supports two databases, MySQL/MariaDB and PostgreSQL, and can be hosted on a Unix-like or Windows web server.

Version	Supported	End of Life
3.5.x	Active development	
3.4.x	Active maintenance	
3.3.x	Active maintenance	
3.2.x	Security only	
3.1.x	Security only; upgrade recommended	
3.0.x	Security only; upgrade recommended	
2.x	Not supported	2021
1.x	Not supported	2005 (approx.)

Note: OJS 2 reached its end of life in 2021, its latest release was the version 2.4.8-5, released in May 2019. When upgrading from the version 2.x to 3.x, some care must be taken given that several features have been added and removed, especially if the installation has hand-made customizations.

== Translations ==
As of version 3.3.0, the software has been translated into 50 languages: Arabic, Armenian, Basque, Belarusian, Bosnian, Bulgarian, Catalan, Chinese, Croatian, Czech, Danish, Dutch, English, Finnish, French, Gaelic, Galician, Georgian, German, Greek, Hebrew, Hindi, Hungarian, Indonesian, Italian, Japanese, Kazakh, Kurdish, Macedonian, Malay, Norwegian, Persian, Polish, Portuguese, Romanian, Russian, Serbian, Slovak, Slovenian, Spanish, Swedish, Turkish, Ukrainian, and Vietnamese, with many additional languages (including Uzbek, Urdu, Sinhala, Lithuanian, Korean, and Mongolian) in development. Translations are created and maintained by the user community.

== Documentation ==
PKP maintains an extensive documentation hub where users can find documentation about all of its systems. The documentation covers basic software usage, migration instructions, development practices, accessibility, video tutorials and the content has been translated partially into other languages. PKP also provides extensive documentation on governance and policies.

== Usage ==
A user community has developed around the software, with the PKP Forum as a centralized location to learn about project developments, correspond with other users, and ask questions of the PKP team.

58,221 journals published at least five items or more with OJS in 2025. A daily updated map showing the location of these journals is also available on PKP's website.

The Public Knowledge Project is collaborated with the International Network for the Availability of Scientific Publications (INASP) to develop scholarly research portals in Africa, Bangladesh, Nepal, and Vietnam. In Venezuela, at least 32 independent organizations, public and private universities publish more than 230 journals using this platform. OJS is also used for research portals in Brazil, Spain, Italy, and Greece.

== Hosting ==
As OJS is open source software, users may download the codebase (from GitHub) and configure and run the software through their preferred hosting solution. PKP makes a Containers repository available for users.

Additionally, OJS hosting service may be purchased from the Public Knowledge Project (PKP), the organizational home of OJS, Open Monograph Press (OMP), and Open Preprint Systems (OPS).

There are also a variety of third-party commercial and non-commercial service providers not affiliated with PKP that provided hosted access to the software for a fee.

== See also ==
- DPubS
- Janeway (by Open Library of Humanities)
