= Project COUNTER =

Project COUNTER, or simply COUNTER (Counting Online Usage of Networked Electronic Resources), is an international non-profit membership organization of libraries, publishers, and vendors. The organization continually develops a standard, the Code of Practice, designed to count the usage of library electronic resources: journals, databases, books, reference works, and multimedia databases.

== Purpose ==
Formed in 2003, COUNTER's main function is to provide the Code of Practice. COUNTER maintains a list of compliant vendors of the Code of Practice.

COUNTER sets and maintains the standard known as the Code of Practice. COUNTER has developed the standard to be used with the ANSI/NISO Z39.93-2014 protocol, called SUSHI, to retrieve usage data quickly.

== History ==
In 2002, publishers and librarians approached usage statistics from very different perspectives. Some publishers, those who were the very first to support COUNTER, understood the potential benefits to their industry of providing usage statistics to an agreed standard; others saw it as an unnecessary extra cost. On the library side there was also a tension between those librarians who wanted a set of practical, implementable usage reports, while others wanted a whole range of very detailed usage data that publishers were unlikely to provide. There were arguments on both sides, but a consensus was reached, resulting in the launch of Project COUNTER in 2003. Its mission is to develop standards for the recording and reporting of the usage of online publications.

Release 1 of the COUNTER Code of Practice for Journals and Databases was published in 2003 and widely implemented by vendors, who proceeded to make the COUNTER Usage Reports available on their websites to their customers. As the number of COUNTER-compliant vendors expanded, the manual downloading of the COUNTER usage reports from a large and growing number of vendor websites became increasingly time-consuming and ultimately a barrier to libraries making effective use of the COUNTER reports. COUNTER, having defined the protocols for the recording and reporting of online journal and database usage, lacked a method for the routine delivery of large volumes of usage data. By the time Release 2 of the COUNTER Code of Practice was published in 2005, there were almost 100 COUNTER-compliant vendors, providing COUNTER reports for over 15,000 journals, as well as for databases and books. An automated way of downloading and consolidating the COUNTER reports was becoming essential if librarians were to continue using the reports. COUNTER discussed the problem with NISO, and the result was the SUSHI protocol, developed by NISO, which enables libraries and library consortia to automate the retrieval of COUNTER usage reports.

Release 3 of the Code of Practice for Journals and Databases replaced Release 2 in August 2009. Release 4 of the COUNTER Code of Practice, an integrated Code of Practice covering journals, databases, and books, as well as multimedia content, replaced Release 3 in December 2013.

In 2017, COUNTER consulted widely with its communities to develop Release 5 (effective from January 2019). The result is a Code of Practice that aims to improve consistency, clarity, and flexibility, allowing for adaptation and extension as digital publishing evolves over the years.

In 2014, COUNTER also published two new Codes of Practice. First, the COUNTER Code of Practice for Articles sets a standard for the recording and reporting of usage at the individual article level. A very important aspect of this code is that it can be implemented by repositories as well as by publishers and aggregators. This is important as repositories represent a significant and growing proportion of online usage. Secondly, a new Code of Practice for Usage Factors, which would enable publishers to calculate Usage Factors for their journals based on COUNTER data. Current projects include the development of a Code of Practice for recording and reporting the usage of research data.

== Usage ==
In 2019, usage of COUNTER statistics was integrated into Unsub, a web-based dashboard tool, to improve the cost-effectiveness of the institutions' subscription sets.

== Structure ==
COUNTER is supervised by a Board of Directors and administered by an Executive Committee and Technical Advisory Group. The Executive Committee and Technical Advisory Group are all volunteers.

== See also ==
- Page view
