= Public Knowledge Project =

Metadata reservation project for e-journals

- Founded: 1998
- Founder: John Willinsky
- Website: pkp.sfu.ca

The Public Knowledge Project (PKP) is a non-profit research initiative that is focused on the importance of making the results of publicly funded research freely available through open access policies, and on developing strategies for making this possible. It is a partnership between the Faculty of Education at the University of British Columbia, the Canadian Centre for Studies in Publishing at Simon Fraser University, the University of Pittsburgh, Ontario Council of University Libraries, the California Digital Library and the School of Education at Stanford University. It seeks to improve the scholarly and public quality of academic research through the development of innovative online environments.

== History ==
The PKP was founded in 1998 by John Willinsky in the Department of Language and Literacy Education at the Faculty of Education at the University of British Columbia, in Vancouver, British Columbia, Canada, based on his research in education and publishing. Willinsky is a leading advocate of open access publishing, and has written extensively on the value of public research.

The PKP's initial focus was on increasing access to scholarly research and output beyond the traditional academic environments. This soon led to a related interest in scholarly communication and publishing, and especially on ways to make it more cost effective and less reliant on commercial enterprises and their generally restricted access models. PKP has developed free, open source software for the management, publishing, and indexing of journals, conferences, and monographs.

The PKP has collaborated with a wide range of partners interested in making research publicly available, including the Scholarly Publishing and Academic Resources Coalition (SPARC), the Brazilian Institute for Information Science and Technology (IBICT), and the International Network for the Availability of Scientific Publications (INASP).

Together with INASP, the PKP is working with publishers, librarians, and academics in the development of scholarly research portals in the developing world, including African Journals OnLine (AJOL) and Asia Journals Online.

As of 2008, the PKP has joined the Synergies Canada initiative, contributing their technical expertise to integrating work being done within a five-party consortium to create a decentralized national platform for social sciences and humanities research communication in Canada.

=== Growth 2005 to 2009 ===
The Public Knowledge Project grew between 2005 and 2009. In 2006, there were approximately 400 journals using Open Journal Systems (OJS), 50 conferences using Open Conference Systems (OCS), 4 organizations using the Harvester, and 350 members registered on the online support forum. In 2009, over 5000 journals were using OJS, more than 500 conferences were using OCS, at least 10 organizations are using the Harvester, and there were over 2400 members on the support forum.

Since 2005, there were major releases (version 2) of three software modules (OJS, OCS, Harvester), as well as the addition of Lemon8-XML, with a growing number of downloads being recorded every month for all of the software. From June 12, 2009 to December 21, 2009, there were 28451 downloads of OJS, 6329 of OCS, 1255 of the Harvester, and 1096 of Lemon8-XML. A new module, Open Monograph Press (a publication management system for monographs) has also been released.

The PKP also witnessed increased community programming contributions, including new plugins and features, such as the subscription module, allowing OJS to support full open access, delayed open access, or full subscription-only access. A growing number of translations have been contributed by community members, with Croatian, English, French, German, Italian, Japanese, Portuguese, Russian, Spanish, Turkish, and Vietnamese versions of OJS completed, and several others in production.

=== Growth from 2010 ===
A German platform, based on OJS, is being developed by the Center for Digital Systems (CeDiS), Free University of Berlin and two other institutions. Funding by the German Research Foundation (DFG) initially runs from 2014 to 2016.

=== Growth from 2021 ===
According to statistics collected from the PKP Beacon project, which was presented at the Open Publishing Fest with the title "Location of known journals using PKP’s Open Journal Systems", OJS is currently being used by at least 54,000 journals across the world. A daily updated map is available at the PKP site. PKP also released the source dataset (updated yearly) as a dataset in Dataverse and the Beacon source code.

== PKP conferences ==
The PKP holds a biannual conference. The First PKP Scholarly Publishing Conference was held in Vancouver, British Columbia, Canada on July 11–13, 2007 and the Second PKP Scholarly Publishing Conference was also held in Vancouver on July 8–10, 2009. The Third PKP Scholarly Publishing Conference was held in Berlin, Germany between 26 and 28 September 2011. The fourth PKP Scholarly Publishing Conference was held in Mexico City, Mexico on August 19–21, 2013.

Notes on the presentations were recorded on a scholarly publishing blog for both the 2007 and 2009 conferences, and selected papers from the 2007 conference were published in a special issue of the online journal First Monday. Papers from the 2009 conference are available in the inaugural issue of the journal Scholarly and Research Communication.

The last meeting was on 20th Nov 2019 in Barcelona and brought together a sprint and a conference attended by more than 160 participants from 25 countries around the world.

== Software ==
The PKP's suite of software includes several separate, but inter-related applications to demonstrate the feasibility of open access: the Open Journal Systems, the Open Preprint Systems the Open Monograph Press, the Open Conference Systems (archived), and the PKP Open Archives Harvester (archived). PKP briefly experimented with a new application, Lemon8-XML, but has since opted to incorporate the XML functionality into the existing applications. All of the products are open source and freely available to anyone interested in using them. They share similar technical requirements (PHP, MySQL/PostgreSQL, Apache or Microsoft IIS 6, and a Linux, BSD, Solaris, Mac OS X, or Windows operating system) and need only a minimal level of technical expertise to get up and running. In addition, the software is well supported with a free, online support forum and a growing body of publications and extensive documentation is available on the project web site.

Increasingly, institutions are combining the PKP software, using OJS to publish their research results, OCS to organize their conferences and publish the proceedings, and the OAI Harvester to organize and make the metadata from these publications searchable. Together with other open source software applications such as DSpace (for creating institutional research repositories), institutions are creating their own infrastructure for sharing their research output.

=== Open Monograph Press ===
Open Monograph Press
- Stable release: 3.3.0-11 / 7 June 2022
- Operating system: Cross-platform
- Available in: Multilingual
- Type: Open access publishing
- License: GNU General Public License
- Website: https://pkp.sfu.ca/omp/

Open Monograph Press, also known as OMP, is an open source software platform for managing and publishing scholarly books. OMP is released under the GNU General Public License.

=== Open Archives Harvester ===
The PKP Open Archives Harvester is software used to accumulate and index freely available metadata, providing a searchable, web-based interface. It is open source, released under the GNU General Public License.

Originally developed to harvest the metadata from Open Journal Systems articles and Open Conference Systems proceedings, the Harvester can be used with any OAI-PMH-compliant resource. It can harvest metadata in a variety of schemas (including unqualified Dublin Core, the PKP Dublin Core extension, the Metadata Object Description Schema (MODS), and MARCXML). Additional schema are supported via plugins. The PKP OA Harvester allows any institution to create their own metadata harvester, which can be focused specifically on gathering information from or for their research community.

== Involved parties ==
It is a partnership among the following entities:

- Simon Fraser University Library
- The University of British Columbia Library
- Canadian Centre for Studies in Publishing at Simon Fraser University
- University of Pittsburgh
- Ontario Council of University Libraries
- Graduate School of Education at Stanford University

== See also ==
- List of open-access journals
- Open access
