= List of library consortia =

Library consortia list

This is a list of library consortia. Libraries often band together in consortia for cooperative resource purchasing and sharing.

== Consortia by country ==
=== International ===
- AMICAL Consortium
- International Coalition of Library Consortia
- International Internet Preservation Consortium
- International Nuclear Library Network

=== Regional ===
- Pacific Manuscripts Bureau, based in Australia
- Center for Research Libraries, North America
- Electronic Information for Libraries
- AmeliCA
- Redalyc
- LA Referencia
- Hemispheric University Consortium Library Network
- ELUNA Mexico

=== Albania ===
- Consortium of Albanian Libraries

=== Algeria ===
- Algerian Consortium of Higher Education and Scientific Research Establishments

=== Argentina ===
- Biblioteca Electrónica de Ciencia y Tecnología (BECYT)
- Red de Bibliotecas Universitarias (UNLP)

=== Armenia ===
- Electronic Library Consortium of Armenia (ELCA), also known as Digital Library Association of Armenia (DLAA)

=== Australia ===
- National & State Libraries Australasia (NSLA) E-Resources Consortium
- Commonwealth Scientific and Industrial Research Organisation Library Services
- CAVAL
- Council of Australasian University Librarians

=== Austria ===
- Kooperation E-Medien Österreich (Austrian Academic Library Consortium KEMOE)
- Austrian Library Network and Service Ltd (German: Österreichische Bibliothekenverbund und Service GmbH)

=== Azerbaijan ===
- Azerbaijan Library and Information Consortium for Availability of Electronic Information (AzLIC)

=== Bangladesh ===
- Library Consortium of Bangladesh (LiCoB)

=== Belgium ===
- Flanders Heritage Library
- Bibliothèque Interuniversitaire de la Communauté française de Belgique(BICfB)
- Elektron

=== Bhutan ===
- Bhutan Library Consortium (BLC)

=== Botswana ===
- Botswana Libraries Consortium (BLC)

=== Brazil ===
- CAPES Periodicals Portal

=== Cameroon ===
- Consortium of Cameroon University and Research Libraries (COCUREL)

=== Canada ===
- The Alberta Library, Canada
- NEOS Library Consortium, Canada
- Ontario Council of University Libraries, Canada
- Saskatchewan Library & Information Services Consortium (SILS), Canada
- Saskatchewan Electronic Resources Partnership (SERP)
- Southern Ontario Library Service, Canada
- Council of Prairie and Pacific University Libraries (COPPUL)

=== Chile ===
- Consorcio para el Acceso a la Información Científica Electrónica (Corporación Cincel), in English: Consortium for the Access to Scientific Information
- Alerta al Conocimiento

=== China ===
- China Academic Library and Information System (CALIS)
- Library Network of the Chinese Academy of Sciences (CAS)
- China Academic Social Sciences & Humanities Library (CASHL)

=== Colombia ===
- Consorcio Colombia / CONSORTIA (ConsCol)

=== Congo ===
- Consortium des Bibliothèques Académiques du Congo (COBAC)

=== Costa Rica ===
- SIBESE-CR (Sistema Bibliotecario de la Educación Superior Universitaria Estatal de Costa Rica)

=== Côte d'Ivoire ===
- Consortium des Bibliothèques de l‘Enseignement Supérieur de Cote d‘Ivoire (COBES-CI)

=== Croatia ===
- Croatian Academic and Research Libraries Consortium (CARLC)
- Union Catalog of Croatian Libraries CROLIST

=== Cuba ===
- Cuban Digital Library Network (Red de Bibliotecas Universitarias)

=== Czech Repiblic ===
- Czech National Centre for Electronic Resources (CzechELib)

=== Democratic Republic of Congo ===
- DRC Library Consortium

=== Denmark ===
- UNGLI, Royal Danish Library (UNGLI)
- Royal Danish Library - National License Consortium (KBNL)

=== El Salvador ===
- Consorcio de Bibliotecas Universitarias de El Salvador (CBUES)

=== Estonia ===
- Consortium of Estonian Libraries Network (ELNET)

=== Ethiopia ===
- Consortium of Ethiopian Academic and Research Libraries (CEARL)

=== Fiji ===
- Fiji Library Consortium

=== Finland ===
- The Finnish National Electronic Library (FinELib)

=== France ===
- Couperin

=== Georgia ===
- Georgian Integrated Library & Information System Consortium (GILISC)

=== Germany ===
- Bayern-Konsortium (English: Bavarian Consortium)
- Bayerische Staatsbibliothek Consortium in Bavaria
- North Rhine-Westphalian Library Service Centre
- DEAL Consortium
- Consortium of Library Networks (AGV)
- ZBW Consortium
- German library consortia (TIB)
- Common Library Network of the German States
- The Friedrich-Althoff-Consortium
- Cooperative Library Network Berlin-Brandenburg (KOBV)
- The Federal Union of German Library Associations (BID) (German: Bibliothek & Information Deutschland)
- Working Group for the Collection of German Imprints (AG SDD)

=== Ghana ===
- Consortium of Academic and Research Libraries in Ghana (CARLIGH)

=== Greece ===
- Hellenic Academic Libraries Link
- Hellenic Economic Library Network(HE.LI.N.) (DIOVI)

=== Guatemala ===
- Comité de Cooperación entre Bibliotecas Universitarias de Guatemala (CCBU)

=== Hong Kong ===
- Joint University Librarians Advisory Committee (JULAC)
- Hong Kong Academic Library Link (HKALL)

=== Hungary ===
- Electronic Information Service National Programme (EISZ)
- National Document Delivery System (ODR)

=== Iceland ===
- Iceland Consortium for Electronic Subscriptions (IC)

=== India ===
- MCIT Library Consortium
- Indian National Digital Library of Engineering, Sciences, and Technology (INDEST)
- TIFR Libraries Consortium
- ISI (Indian Statistical Institute) Library Consortium
- UGC DAE Consortium for Scientific Research
- IIM Libraries Consortia
- RGUHS-Health Science Library and Information Network (HELINET)
- UGC-INFONET Digital Library Consortium
- National Library and Information Services Infrastructure for Scholarly Content (N-List)
- National Knowledge Resource Consortium (NKRC)
- e-ShodhSindhu: Consortium for Higher Education Electronic Resources (e-SS)
- DBT's Electronic Library Consortium (DeLCON Consortium)
- VTU Consortium (VTUCON)

=== Indonesia ===
- FPPTI (Forum Perpustakaan Perguruan Tinggi Indonesia)
- National Digital Library
- FKP2TN (Forum Kerjasama Perpustakaan Perguruan Tinggi Negeri)

=== Iran ===
- Consortium of Iranian Medical & Science Libraries (CONSIRAN)
- ACNET (Academic Computer Network of Iran)
- National Library and Archives of Iran (NLAI)
- Isfahan Regional Library Consortium
- Amin Interlibrary Loan Plan

=== Ireland ===
- Consortium of National and University Libraries (CONUL)
- Irish Research eLibrary (IReL)

=== Israel ===
- MALMAD - the Israeli Inter University center for Digital Information Services (MALMAD)

=== Italy ===
- CARE – Coordinamento per l’Accesso alle Risorse Elettroniche (CARE)
- Consorzio Interistituzionale per Progetti Elettronici (CIPE)

=== Japan ===
- Japan Alliance of University Library Consortia for E-Resources (JUSTICE)

=== Jordan ===
- Center of Excellence for Jordanian Public University Library Services (CoE for JOPULS)

=== Kenya ===
- Kenya Libraries and Information Services Consortium (KLISC)

=== South Korea ===
- Korean Electronic Site License Initiative (KESLI Consortium)
- Academic Consortium of Electronic Resources (ACE)

=== Kosovo ===
- Association of Electronic Libraries in Kosova (AELK)

=== Kyrgyzstan ===
- Kyrgyzstan Library Information Consortium (KLIC)

=== Latvia ===
- National Library of Latvia

=== Lebanon ===
- Lebanese Academic Library Consortium (LALC)

=== Lesotho ===
- Lesotho Library Consortium (LELICO)

=== Lithuania ===
- Lithuanian Research Library Consortium (LMBA) (Lietuvos mokslinių bibliotekų asociacija)

=== Luxembourg ===
- Consortium Luxembourg

=== Malawi ===
- Malawi Library and Information Consortium (MALICO)

=== Malaysia ===
- u-Pustaka Consortium Libraries (u-Pustaka)
- Malaysian Online E-Resources Consortium (MOLEC)
- Consortium of Electronic Resources for Higher Education (KONSEPt)

=== Mexico ===
- CONRICyT (Consorcio Nacional de Recursos de Información Científica y Tecnológica)
- Red Nacional de Bibliotecas Públicas (RNBP)
- Red Nacional de Bibliotecas Públicas (REBIUNAM)
- Red de Bibliotecas del Centro Histórico de la Ciudad de México

=== Moldova ===
- Electronic Resources for Moldova (REM) (esurse Electronice pentru Moldova)

=== Mongolia ===
- Mongolian Libraries Consortium (MLC)

=== Mozambique ===
- Fundo Bibliográfico da Língua Portuguesa

=== Namibia ===
- Namibia Library Consortium (NALICO)

=== Nepal ===
- Nepal Library and Information Consortium (NeLIC)

=== Netherlands ===
- Ligue des Bibliothèques Européennes de Recherche – Association of European Research Libraries (LIBER)
- SURF

=== New Zealand ===
- Electronic Purchasing In Collaboration (EPIC)

=== Nigeria ===
- Nigerian University Libraries Consortium (NULIB)
- NgREN (Nigerian Research and Education Network)

=== North Macedonia ===
- Macedonian e-Libraries (MEL)

=== Norway ===
- Norwegian Agency for Shared Services in Education and Research (Sikt)

=== Oman ===
- Oman Virtual Science Library (MASADER)

=== Pakistan ===
- Higher Education Commission (HEC) National Digital Library Programme
- Consortium of Science & Technology and Research & Development Libraries of Pakistan (CSTRDLP)

=== Palestine ===
- Palestinian Library and Information Consortium (PALICO)

=== Paraguay ===
- Red de Bibliotecas Universitarias (Network of University Libraries)

=== Philippines ===
- Academic Libraries Book Acquisition Services Association, Inc. (ALBASA)
- South Manila Inter-Institutional Consortium (SMI-IC)
- Aurora Boulevard Consortium Libraries, Inc. (ABCLI)
- Quezon City Library Consortium (QCLC)
- Cagayan Library Consortium (CLC)
- Manila Academic & Public Library Consortium
- Consortium of Engineering Libraries in the Philippines (CELPh)
- Intramuros Library Consortium
- Oritgas Center Library Consortium
- Inter University Consortium
- American Corners (American Studies Resource Center ASRC)
- Davao Colleges and University Network
- Network of Calabarzon Educational Institutions (NOCEI) Library Consortium
- Mendiola Consortium (MC)
- Consortium of the South (COTS)
- Philippine Association for Academic Research Library Network (PAARLNET)
- DOST-ESEP Library Network

=== Portugal ===
- Biblioteca do Conhecimento Online (b-on / FCCN) (b-on)

=== Puerto Rico ===
- Consorcio de Bibliotecas Metropolitanas (COBIMET)

=== Qatar ===
- Qatar National Library Consortium (QNL Consortium)

=== Romania ===
- The Association of the Universities, Research & Development Institutes and Central University Libraries in Romania (Anelis Plus)

=== Russia ===
- Associated Regional Library Consortia (ARBICON)
- National Electronic Information Consortium (NEICON)
- Regional University and Science Library Advanced Network (RUSLANet)

=== Saudi Arabia ===
- Saudi Digital Library (SDL)

=== Senegal ===
- Consortium des Bibliothèques de l’Enseignement Supérieur du Sénégal (COBESS)
- Consortium des Bibliothèques d’Enseignement Supérieur et de Recherche au Sénégal

=== Serbia ===
- KoBSON (KoBSON)

=== Singapore ===
- Singapore Alliance of University Libraries

=== Slavak Republik ===
- Slovak National Consortium for Electronic Information Resources (SKeLIB)

=== Slovenia ===
- Consortium of Slovene Electronic Collections (COSEC)
- CTK Slovenia (CTK)

=== South Africa ===
- Gauteng and Environs Library Consortium, South Africa
- South East Academic Libraries System, South Africa
- Cape Library Cooperative (CALICO)
- Free State Library and Information Consortium
- South African National Library and Information Consortium (SANLiC)

=== Spain ===
- Consortium of University Services in Catalonia (CSUC)
- University Library Consortium of Madrid (Consorcio Madroño)
- Consortium of Academic Libraries of Andalusia
- Consortium of Academic Libraries of Galicia
- Spanish University Consortium
- Spanish National Research Council Library and Archives Network (CSIC) (Red de Bibliotecas y Archivos del CSIC)

=== Sudan ===
- Sudanese Academic Libraries Consortium (SALC)

=== Sweden ===
- Bibsam Consortium
- Eira

=== Switzerland ===
- Consortium of Swiss Academic Libraries (CSAL)
- Accessible Books Consortium (ABC)
- Library Network of Western Switzerland

=== Taiwan ===
- CONCERT (CONsortium on Core Electronic Resources in Taiwan)
- TAEBDC (Taiwan Academic Electronic Book & Database Consortium)
- NBINet (National Bibliographic Information Network)
- NDDS (Nationwide Document Delivery Service)

=== Tanzania ===
- Consortium of Tanzania Universities and Research Libraries (COTUL)

=== Thailand ===
- Thai University Library Network (ThaiLIS)
- Provincial University Library Network (PULINET)

=== Turkey ===
- National Academic License for Electronic Resources (EKUAL)
- ANATOLIAN UNIVERSITY LIBRARIES CONSORTIUM (ANKOS)

=== Uganda ===
- Consortium of Uganda University Libraries (CUUL)

=== Ukraine ===
- National Consortium EIFL Ukraine

=== United Kingdom ===
- M25 Consortium of Academic Libraries, England, UK
- SELMS, UK
- The Library Consortium (TLC), UK
- Scottish Confederation of University and Research Libraries (SCURL)
- Scottish Higher Education Digital Library (SHEDL)
- Wales Higher Education Libraries Forum (WHELF)
- TalNet Anglesey, Conwy & Gwynedd Library Network

=== United States ===
- Academic Libraries of Indiana (ALI)
- Amigos Library Services, US
- Beehive Library Consortium, a division of Utah's Online Public Library
- Bibliographic Association of the Red River, Texas
- Bibliographical Center for Research, Colorado
- Black Metropolis Research Consortium (BMRC)
- Boston Library Consortium
- Califa, a library consortium representing 200+ libraries in California
- Catamount Library Network, Vermont
- Chemeketa Cooperative Regional Library Service, Oregon
- CLEVNET, Ohio
- Colorado Alliance of Research Libraries
- Colorado Library Consortium
- ConnectNY
- CONSORT Colleges, Ohio
- Consortium of Academic and Research Libraries in Illinois
- Consortium of Universities of the Washington Metropolitan Area
- Detroit Area Library Network
- Digital Library Federation, US
- Digital Scriptorium, based in US
- East Coast Consortium of Slavic Library Collections (ECC)
- HBCU Library Alliance, US
- Illinois Heartland Library System
- Jefferson County Library Cooperative, Alabama
- Keystone Library Network, Pennsylvania
- Library and Information Resources Network, Florida
- LINCC: Libraries in Clackamas County, Oregon
- LOUIS: The Louisiana Library Network
- Lyrasis, US
- Main Library Alliance, New Jersey
- Massachusetts Library Association
- Metropolitan Library Service Agency, Minnesota
- Metropolitan New York Library Council
- Michigan eLibrary
- Michigan Library Consortium
- Midwest Transportation Knowledge Network, US
- Minitex, US
- Minuteman Library Network, Massachusetts
- Missouri Library Network Corporation
- Missouri Evergreen
- MOBIUS, Missouri
- Municipal Library Consortium of St. Louis County
- National Research Libraries Alliance, US
- NC Live, North Carolina
- NEFLIN, Florida
- NELINET, New England
- New York Area Theological Library Association
- Nylink, New York
- Ohio Public Library Information Network
- OhioLINK
- Orbis Cascade Alliance, US
- Private Academic Library Network of Indiana
- RAILS (Reaching Across Illinois Library System), Illinois
- Recollection Wisconsin
- Research Libraries Group, US
- Rigler-Deutsch Index, US
- SAILS, Massachusetts
- SCELC (Statewide California Electronic Library Consortium)
- SearchOhio
- South Central Library System, Wisconsin
- System Wide Automated Network (SWAN), Illinois
- Tampa Bay Library Consortium, Florida
- TexShare, Texas
- TRAILS, Montana
- UAA/APU Consortium Library, Alaska
- Utah Academic Library Consortium
- Vermont Organization of Koha Automated Libraries
- Washington Research Library Consortium
- Wisconsin Library Services (WiLS)
- Wisconsin Public Library Consortium
- Wisconsin Schools Digital Library

=== Uruguay ===
- Trama Interinstitucional y Multidisciplinaria de Bibliografía On-line (Portal Timbó)

=== Uzbekistan ===
- EIFL Uzbekistan Consortium

=== Vietnam ===
- Vietnam Library Consortium on E-Resources (VLC)
- Vietnam National University Library and Information Center (VNU-LIC)

=== Zambia ===
- Zambia Library Consortium (ZALICO)

=== Zimbabwe ===
- Public Library Consortium (PLC)
- College and Research Library Consortium (CARLiC)
- Zimbabwe University Libraries Consortium (ZULC)

== See also ==
- Lists of libraries
- List of library associations
- Electronic Information for Libraries (EIFL)
