= LOUIS: The Louisiana Library Network =

Library consortium in Louisiana

LOUIS: The Louisiana Library Network is a library consortium made up of 47 college and university libraries in the state of Louisiana. LOUIS was founded in 1992 by library deans and directors at both public and private institutions in the state. LOUIS is governed by the Louisiana Board of Regents; an executive board made up of consortia members advises the consortia. LOUIS is also a member of the International Coalition of Library Consortia, or ICOLC.

The consortia's work includes technology support, cooperative procurement of electronic resources, affordable access to course materials, digital inclusion, and community building and professional development.

== Members ==
- Baton Rouge Community College
- Bossier Parish Community College
- Centenary College of Louisiana
- Central Louisiana Technical Community College
- Delgado Community College
- Dillard University
- Fletcher Technical Community College
- Franciscan Missionaries of Our Lady University
- Grambling State University
- Louisiana Christian University
- Louisiana Delta Community College
- Louisiana State University
- Louisiana State University Eunice
- Louisiana State University Health Sciences Center New Orleans
- Louisiana State University Health Sciences Center Shreveport
- Louisiana State University Law Center
- Louisiana State University of Alexandria
- Louisiana State University Shreveport
- Louisiana Tech University
- Louisiana Universities Marine Consortium
- Loyola University New Orleans
- Loyola University New Orleans College of Law
- McNeese State University
- New Orleans Baptist Theological Seminary
- Nicholls State University
- Northshore Technical Community College
- Northwest Louisiana Technical College
- Northwestern State University of Louisiana
- Notre Dame Seminary
- Nunez Community College
- Pennington Biomedical Research Center
- River Parishes Community College
- Saint Joseph Seminary College
- South Louisiana Community College
- Southeastern Louisiana University
- Southern University
- Southern University at New Orleans
- Southern University at Shreveport
- Southern University Law Center
- SOWELA Technical Community College
- Tulane University
- Tulane University Law School
- University of Holy Cross
- University of Louisiana at Lafayette
- University of Louisiana at Monroe
- University of New Orleans
- Xavier University of Louisiana

== See also ==
- List of library consortia
