= University of Texas at San Antonio Libraries =

UTSA Libraries
- The John Peace Library
- Location: San Antonio, Texas, United States
- Type: Academic library
- Established: 1976

Collection
- Items collected: books, journals, newspapers, magazines, sound and music recordings, maps, manuscripts, photographs, art collections, and films

Access and use
- Population served: UTSA University Students, Faculty, and Staff, and outlying area
- Members: UTSA University Students, Faculty, and Staff, and courtesy users from outlying area

Other information
- Website: UTSA Libraries

The University of Texas at San Antonio Libraries (UTSA Libraries) is the academic library of The University of Texas at San Antonio, a state research university in San Antonio, Texas, United States. UTSA Libraries consists of the John Peace Library (JPL) on the Main Campus, the Downtown Library, and the Applied Engineering and Technology (AET) Library. The libraries provide students and faculty with a comprehensive access to information as well as spaces for active learning, teaching, and interdisciplinary scholarship.

== History ==
The John Peace Library was the first library built at UTSA and officially opened its doors on Wednesday, June 2, 1976. The Downtown and AET libraries opened in 1999 and 2010, respectively. The JPL was named after the first collection donated to UTSA. Before its opening, the library was housed in the Physical Education Building. The first UTSA president, Arleigh B. Templeton, who had previously overseen the design of the library at Sam Houston State University, envisioned a similar library for UTSA. "I said that what I wanted to do was take four football fields and stack them on top of each other," said Templeton in a 2003 oral history interview. "In the middle I want the little librarians… And this one over here (UTSA) was a prize jewel."

The John Peace Library was designed by San Antonio architect O'Neil Ford, whose work also included the Trinity University (Texas) campus and the Tower of the Americas. When it opened, the library was the largest building on UTSA's campus. At the time it housed 350,000 volumes (200,000 of them on microfilm) and study spaces for about 1,300 students.

== Collections and Services ==
=== Collections ===
UTSA Libraries collections consists of millions of print and digital resources, including books, e-books, journals, databases, and audiovisual items. Through a partnership with HathiTrust, the UTSA community has access to over 13 million scholarly research materials recently made available digitally. The John Peace Library serves as a depository for state and federal government documents.

=== Delivery of Materials ===
The UTSA Libraries provide access to materials through its Get It For Me (Interlibrary Loan) service, which finds and delivers items owned by UTSA or other libraries to faculty, students and staff. The library also participates in the TexShare reciprocal borrowing system, hosted by the Texas State Library and Archives Commission, which allows UTSA students, faculty and staff to borrow books from academic libraries throughout the state of Texas.

== Libraries ==
=== John Peace Library ===
The Quiet Study Area located on the JPL's 2nd floor

The John Peace Library on UTSA's Main Campus completed a 5-year renovation process in July 2014. JPL provides professionally staffed service points throughout the building, including three staffed information desks as well as a suite housing the Judith G. Gardner Center for Writing Excellence and the tutoring and supplemental instruction units of the Tomás Rivera Center for Student Success. JPL displays artwork donated by AT&T in 2008 when the company moved their corporate headquarters from San Antonio to Dallas.

JPL features over 2,200 seats and 370 computers; an Information Commons; GroupSpot, a digital classroom and study space that facilitates collaboration through small group tables with shared displays; quiet study and computing areas; and 44 reservable group study rooms. The Faculty Center, located on JPL's 4th floor, provides a central hub for faculty professional development. The Assembly Room, also located on JPL's 4th floor, provides a 120-seat venue intended for major academic events drawing audiences from across the university and local community.

=== Downtown Library ===
The Downtown Library located at UTSA's Downtown Campus

Located on UTSA's Downtown Campus in the Buena Vista Street Building, the Downtown Library provides the same services available at the John Peace Library on the Main Campus. The Downtown Library houses the main collections of books and periodicals for Architecture, Interior Design, Criminal Justice, Public Administration, and Social Work. In addition, the library has a general collection to support Downtown Campus students across a variety of disciplines, as well as collections of DVDs, CDs, popular reading, juvenile literature, and curriculum materials.

The Downtown Library has quiet study areas and 15 reservable group study rooms. In addition, it offers 36 desktop computers including a quiet computing area, printers, media viewing equipment, a high-speed KIC scanner, laptops, and other tech gear for checkout.

=== AET Library ===
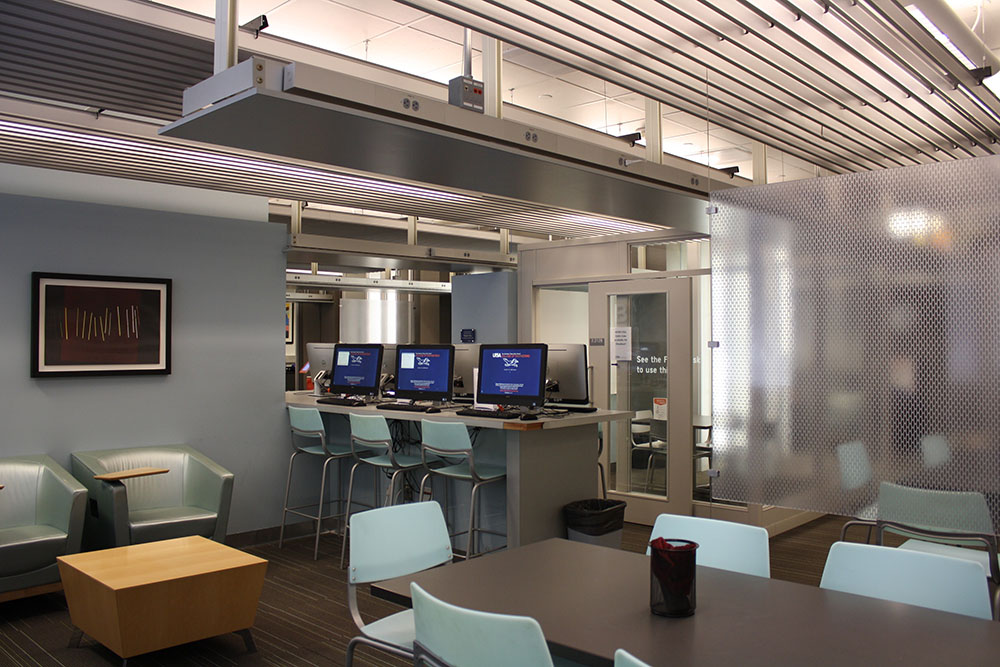
The AET library located in the Applied Engineering and Technology Building

In 2010, UTSA opened the Applied Engineering and Technology (AET) Library, recognized by the New York Times and USA Today as the nation's first bookless library on a college or university campus. The 2,200 square foot, 80-person capacity library primarily serves students in the Colleges of Engineering and Sciences.

The library features three group study rooms and ten public computers, a scanner, printer, and five large LCD screens. The study rooms are outfitted with whiteboard paint and writable glass surfaces, to facilitate group collaboration on problems.

== John Peace Library Renovations ==
In summer of 2014, the John Peace Library reached the end of a five-year renovation process, supporting UTSA's goal to attain Tier One research university status. The makeover was designed to modernize the 1976 building and to support learning and research in a digital age.

Phase one of the project (2008-2009) included the creation of an Information Commons with 125 new computer workstations, a Laptop Lounge, new furniture, and improved lighting throughout the building's second floor.

Phase two (2010) involved integration of the Judith G. Gardner Writing Center as well as the tutoring and supplemental instruction units of the Tomás Rivera Center for Student Success. Also included was the expansion of the Information Commons, providing an additional 75 computer workstations, as well as the creation of an 80-seat quiet study room.

Phase three (2013-2014) included the creation of the Faculty Center, to provide spaces for faculty to relax and collaborate with colleagues. It also included the creation of GroupSpot, a collaborative digital classroom – the first of its kind on UTSA's campus. The 100-seat classroom allows students to work in small groups on individual laptops while using shared computer monitors to collaborate on projects.

== Faculty Center ==
The Faculty Center located on the 4th floor of the JPL

Occupying 4,600 square feet on the fourth floor of the John Peace Library, the Faculty Center is a collaborative effort of three independent campus units: The Office of the Vice Provost for Academic and Faculty Support, UTSA Research and the UTSA Libraries. The Faculty Center serves as a centralized clearinghouse for all professional development resources for faculty available at the university.

The center's physical features include a conference room, five breakout rooms, a digital studio, and a casual seating area for informal collaborations. Faculty Center events include orientation and cohort-building sessions for new faculty, workshops on best teaching and research practices, formal and informal mentoring programs, and consultations and support for faculty.

== Special Collections ==
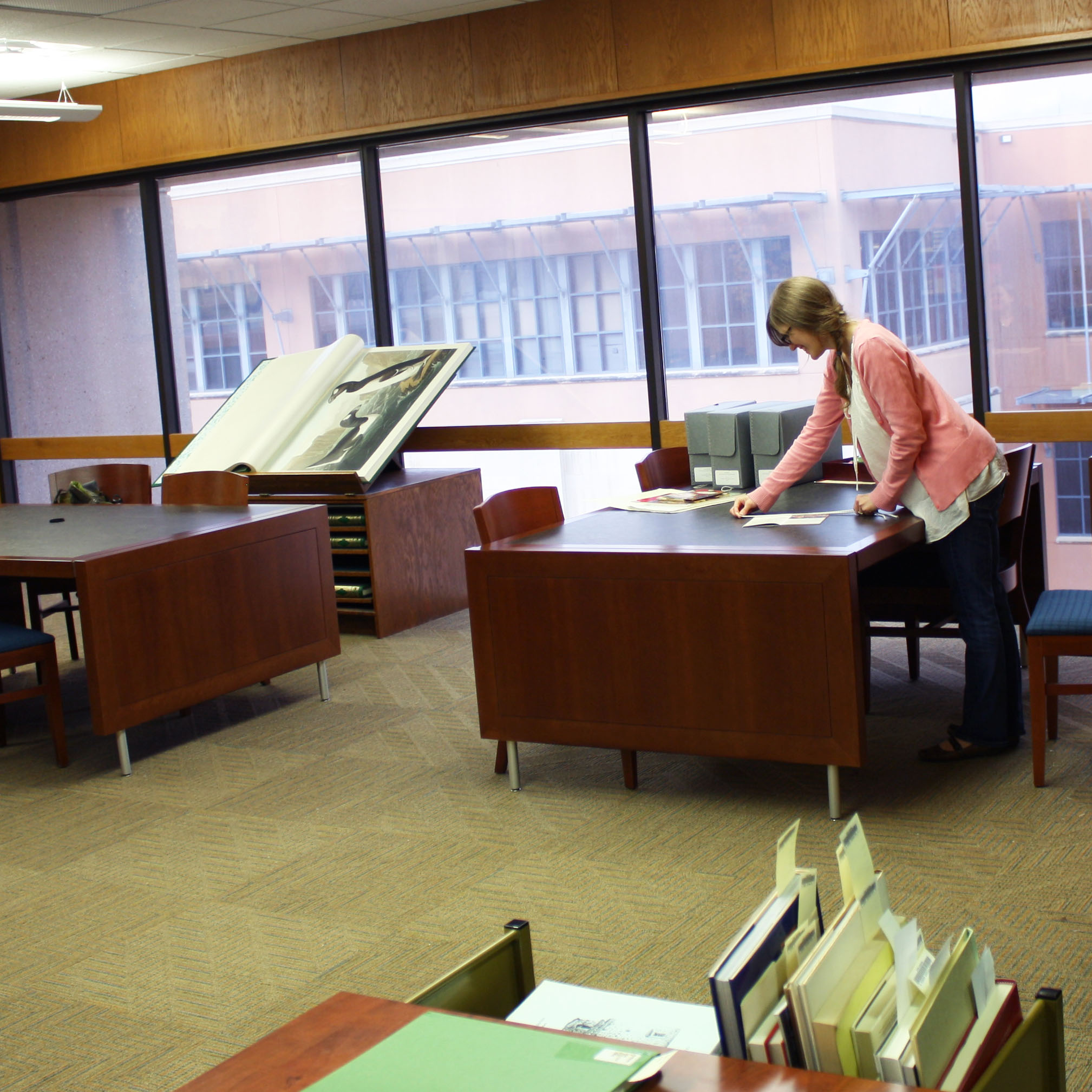
The Special Collections Reading Room located on the 4th floor of the JPL

UTSA Libraries Special Collections builds, preserves, and provides access to distinctive archival, photographic, and printed materials, with a particular emphasis on documenting the diverse histories and development of San Antonio and South Texas.

Strengths of the collections include the history of the African American and LGBTQ communities in the local region, the history of women and gender in Texas, Mexican-American activism and advertising, the Tex-Mex food industry, and urban planning. The collections are open to both academic and casual researchers.

Several collections have been partially or fully digitized, allowing researchers to search, view and download materials from UTSA's Digital Collections website.

Included in these collections are materials from the Institute of Texan Cultures, UTSA's cultural heritage museum noted for its rich photography archive, as well as the university's own historical archives.

== Special Events ==
- 2012 Best-selling author and ¡Ask a Mexican! columnist Gustavo Arellano
- 2012 Provost's Distinguished Lecture featuring best-selling author Gary Taubes
- 2014 Signature Speaker Dr. Freeman A. Hrabowski III

== Awards ==
- 2014 John Cotton Dana Award
- 2014 - ASID Austin Design Excellence Award for Large Corporate Space (John Peace Library)
- 2013 Best of Show Award - Library Leadership Administration and Management Association
- 2013 Award of Excellence in creative tactics (Mobile site campaign) - Public Relations Society of America, San Antonio Chapter
- 2013 Top 100 Most Social Media Friendly College & University Libraries
- 2011 - American Institute of Architects Award (AET Library)
- 2012 Texas Library Association Branding Iron Award and Best of Show (National Library Week campaign)

== Memberships ==
- Hathitrust
- Sponsoring Consortium for Open Access Publishing in Particle Physics (SCOAP3)
- Portico
- Amigos Library Services
- TexShare
- OCLC Research Library Partnership
- Center for Research Libraries (CRL)
- Coalition for Networked Information (CNI)
- National Information Standards Organization (NISO)
- EX libris Library Users of North America (ELUNA)
- Texas Council of Academic Libraries (TCAL)
- Texas Library Association (TLA)
