= China Academic Library and Information System =

Public service system to provide resource sharing among academic libraries in China

The China Academic Library and Information System (CALIS; Chinese: 中国高等教育文献保障系统) is a resource sharing system for library consortium cooperation in China. The system was initiated in 1998 and constructed in several phases, but has been in operation since 2001 when the first phase has been completed.

== History ==
In the 1990s, China's library automation program began to take off. The Ministry of Education (MOE) decided to build a public resource sharing system under the "211 Project", and CALIS and CERNET came into being. The MOE appointed Peking University to be in charge of CALIS and Tsinghua University to be in charge of CERNET.

In November 1998, the National Development Planning Commission (NDPC) officially approved the construction of the CALIS project. As of July 2001, the first phase of CALIS was checked and accepted by the MOE, National Development and Reform Commission (NDRC), and the Ministry of Finance (MOF). In September 2002, the MOE, the NDRC and the MOF decided to combine the CALIS Phase II construction with the Chinese-America Digital Academic Library. The CALIS Phase II was checked and accepted in August 2006. This was followed by the Phase III that began in 2008 and was accepted in 2012. Since 2013, CALIS has been receiving long-term funding from the MOE to support operations.

== Services ==
As one of the largest resource sharing systems in the world, CALIS incorporates information from a wide range of libraries and institutions. Through information sharing, CALIS has reached out to less developed provinces such as Jilin, where 94% of the universities have joined CALIS as of CALIS Phase III.

As of 2010, CALIS has four national centers located at Peking University, Tsinghua University, Peking University Medical School, and China Agricultural University. There is also a regional center for seven regions, located at Jilin University (Northeast Regional Center), Nanjing University (East China Regional Center), Shanghai Jiao Tong University (Southeast China Regional Center), Sun Yat-sen University (South China Regional Center), Wuhan University (Central China Regional Center), Xi'an Jiaotong University (Northwest Regional Center), and Sichuan University (Southwest Regional Center).

== See also ==
- List of library consortia
- Libraries in China
