= Bernard Revel Graduate School of Jewish Studies =

The Bernard Revel Graduate School of Jewish Studies was Yeshiva University’s first graduate school. Founded in 1937, it was named for Yeshiva University's first president, Bernard Revel, upon his death in 1940. Its curriculum prepares highly trained teachers, researchers, and scholars in Jewish studies and emphasizes the critical analysis of primary sources, studies in methodology, and extensive readings in secondary literature.

Arthur Hyman was replaced as Revel's dean by David Berger in 2008, though he maintained the position of Distinguished Service Professor of Philosophy until his death in 2017. Berger was succeeded by Daniel Rynhold in 2020.

== Academics ==
The School offers the following degree programs:

- M.A. in Bible, Medieval Jewish History, Modern Jewish history, Jewish Philosophy, and Talmudic Studies
- Ph.D. in Jewish Studies with concentrations in Bible, Jewish History, Jewish Philosophy, and Talmudic Studies
- joint B.A./M.A. program for Yeshiva University undergraduates

The Harry Fischel School for Higher Jewish Studies, established in 1945, offers the Revel program during the summer, with courses taught by distinguished visiting scholars, many from Israeli universities.

A milestone was reached in 2011 when the first woman was awarded a Ph.D. in Talmudic Studies.

== Facilities ==
Classes are held at Yeshiva University's Wilf Campus in New York City’s Washington Heights neighborhood. Facilities include the Mendel Gottesman Library, with comprehensive research collections (some 200,000 volumes strong) in Jewish studies, as well as Yeshiva University Archives' extensive primary source collections. The library is also a member of METRO and the New York Area Theological Library Association.
