= Consortium of Academic and Research Libraries in Illinois =

Academic consortium in Illinois, United States

Consortium of Academic and Research Libraries in Illinois (CARLI)
- Formation: 2005; 21 years ago
- Type: Nonprofit library consortium
- Headquarters: Champaign, Illinois, US
- Director: Laurie Blandino
- Website: www.carli.illinois.edu

Consortium of Academic and Research Libraries in Illinois (CARLI) is an academic consortium of public and private university and research libraries in the state of Illinois.

== History ==
The Consortium of Academic and Research Libraries in Illinois (CARLI) began operating on July 1, 2005. CARLI was formed through the consolidation of existing consortia: Illinois Cooperative Collection Management Program (ICCMP), Illinois Digital Academic Library (IDAL), and Illinois Library Computer Systems Organization (ILCSO). The consolidation resulted in efficiencies, cost reductions for members, and enabled expanded services as requested by its member libraries.

The University of Illinois System serves as CARLI’s fiscal agent, and CARLI operates as a unit of the University of Illinois System Office for Academic Affairs. CARLI is governed by a 12-person board, 9 of whom are elected by the 124 governing member institutions. Members are a mix of public universities, community colleges, and private institutions incorporated in Illinois.

== Services ==
CARLI provides numerous services to its members, including a consortial catalog known as I-SHARE, digital collections managed using the ContentDM software, electronic resources, and collection management including open educational resources. Interlibrary loan, which includes 24-hour delivery to members, are a key service for participating member libraries.
