= ConnectNY =

Library consortium based in New York, U.S.

ConnectNY (CNY) was a library consortium of New York State academic libraries and the Center for Research Libraries that lent and borrowed books from a shared catalog. Founded in 2003 with Mellon Foundation funding, CNY "support[ed] resource sharing and enhancement of services to users through programs in cooperative collecting, access to electronic resources and physical collections, and expedited interlibrary loan and document delivery." In 2010, CNY became an incorporated 501(c)(3) non-profit organization in New York State. At that time, CNY consisted of 15 libraries and 16 collections (CRL's holdings were incorporated into the catalog).

Its membership having declined to only 12 libraries, CNY ceased operations in June 2024.
