= Daniel Rynhold =

American theologian and academic

Professor Daniel Rynhold is Dean at the Bernard Revel Graduate School of Jewish Studies at Yeshiva University in New York City where he has worked since August 2007.

He became the Shoshana Shier Distinguished Visiting Professor at the University of Toronto's Centre for Jewish Studies in 2019. He was previously Lecturer in Judaism in the Department of Theology and Religious Studies at King's College, London.

He received a B.A. in Philosophy at Cambridge University, an MA in Hebrew and Jewish Studies at University College London and a PhD in Jewish philosophy at the London School of Economics. His doctoral thesis, dated 2000, was titled Justifying one's practices: Two models of Jewish philosophy. Rynhold also teaches at the Bergen County High School of Jewish Studies.

His academic interests include the philosophical thought of Moses Maimonides and Joseph Soloveitchik and the relationship between Jewish and non-Jewish philosophy.

== Publications ==
- "Good and Evil, Truth and Falsity: Maimonides and Moral Cognitivism." Trumah No. 12 (2002), pp. 163–182.
- Two Models of Jewish Philosophy: Justifying One's Practices, (Oxford University Press, 2005)
- An Introduction to Medieval Jewish Philosophy, (I. B. Tauris, 2009)
