= Lebanese Academic Library Consortium =

The Lebanese Academic Library Consortium (LALC) was created in 2002. It started with five members, and has grown to nine Lebanese academic institutions by 2011. LALC's mission is “to cooperate in the selection, pricing negotiations, and access methods of electronic resources” for the best interests of the universities and their library users. An example of a resource that all members of the LALC can access is Elsevier's ScienceDirect database, which the LALC signed an agreement with in 2002. It is the first ever library consortium to be established in Lebanon. LALC is part of a larger group of libraries called the International Coalition of Library Consortia.

== Member Institutions ==
- American University of Beirut: University Libraries
- Lebanese American University: University Libraries
- Notre Dame University – Louaize: University Libraries
- University of Balamand: University Libraries
- Holy Spirit University of Kaslik: Main Library
- Saint Joseph University: Medical Library
- Beirut Arab University: University Libraries
- Haigazian University: University Libraries
