= Bibliographic Association of the Red River =

- Location: Grayson County, Texas
- Branches: 4

Other information
- Website: http://www.barr.org

The Bibliographic Association of the Red River (BARR) is a consortium of four independent libraries in Grayson County, Texas. The consortium was formed for patrons to access resources from the combined libraries. A valid library card from any of the member libraries, and TexShare Card holders, can be used at any other BARR member library.

== Members ==
BARR library membership consists of two municipal, a community college, and private-university.

- Austin College Abell Library
- Denison Public Library
- Grayson College Library
- Sherman Public Library
