= Notre Dame University–Louaize =

Catholic school in Zouk Mosbeh, Lebanon

- جامعة سيدة اللويزة
- Motto: Gaudium de Veritate ("Joy from Truth")
- Type: Catholic university
- Established: August 14, 1987; 39 years ago (1978 as LCHE)
- President: Father Bechara Khoury
- Faculty: 205 full-time 298 part-time
- Students: 7,000 (fall 2019)
- Location: Zouk Mosbeh, Keserwan, Lebanon; 33°57′0.3″N 35°36′44.21″E
- Campus: Suburban, 60.29 acres (244,000 m^{2})
- Website: www.ndu.edu.lb

Notre Dame University–Louaize (NDU; Arabic: جامعة سيدة اللويزة, romanized: Jāmiʿat Sayyidat al-Luwayza) is a private Catholic university in Zouk Mosbeh, Lebanon, founded as Louaize College for Higher Education (LCHE) in 1978 in cooperation with Beirut University College. The name was changed to its present name in 1987, when the President of the Lebanese Republic issued a decree granting it the right to operate an independent university. NDU is accredited by New England Commission of Higher Education (NECHE), and as of 2007 ranked fifth in Lebanon.

== History ==
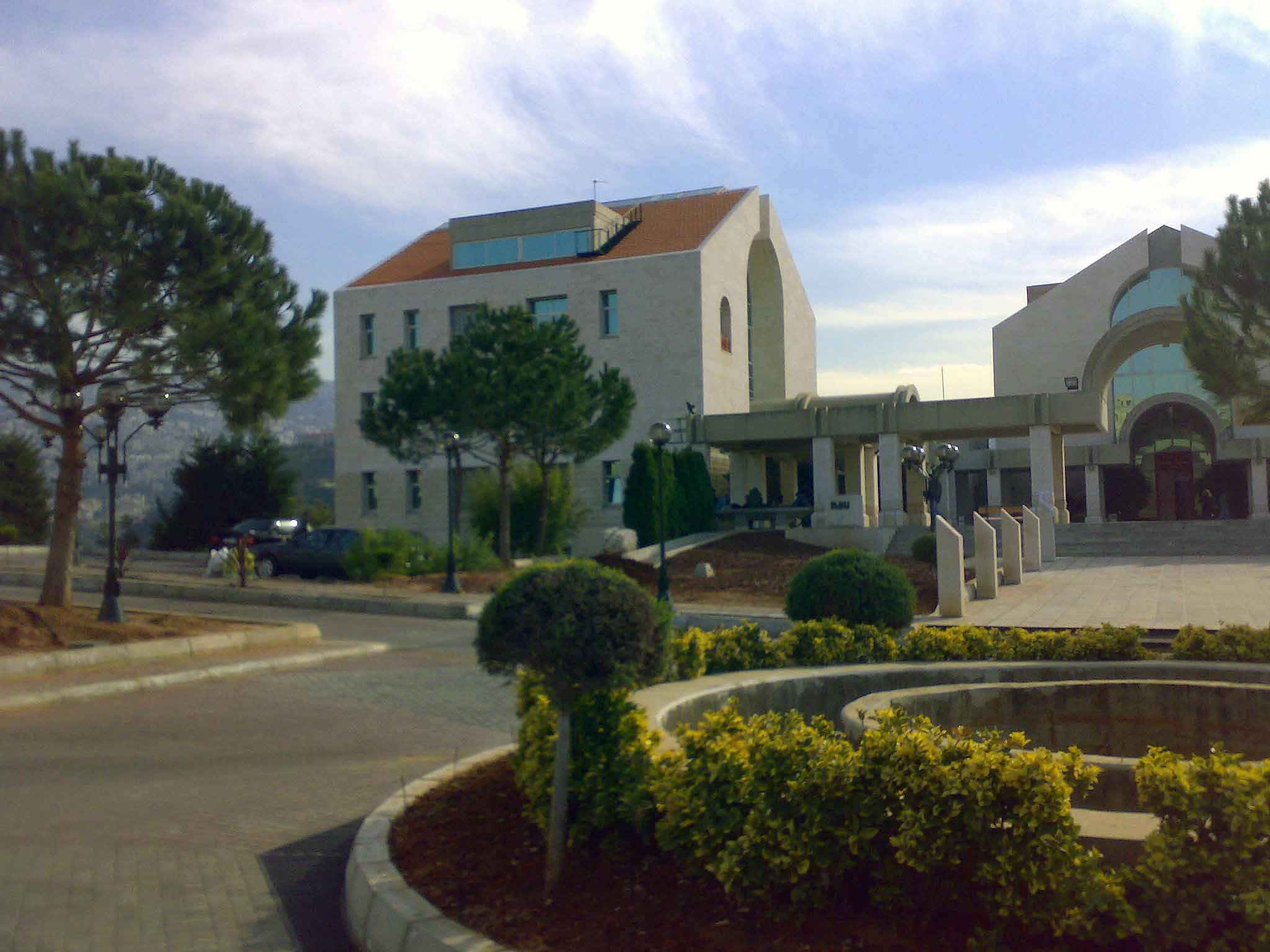
NDU Main Campus

Notre Dame University–Louaize (NDU) was founded by the Maronite Order of The Blessed Virgin Mary (OMM). Since its foundation in 1695, the Order's stated goal was to promote education and improve the lives of Lebanese people. In 1978, the Order started a new project and Reverend Bechara Boutros Rahi (a former member of the Order and current Maronite Patriarch) founded, in cooperation with Beirut University College (BUC), now the Lebanese American University (LAU), the Louaize College for Higher Education (LCHE), the nucleus of today's NDU. The legal finalization of this project was the promulgation of Decree 4116 by the President of the Lebanese Republic Amine Gemayel on August 14, 1987, granting the right to operate an independent university.

== Academics ==
The university adopts the American system of education. Notre Dame University–Louaize offers 76 major fields of study divided between undergraduate and graduate degree programs. Minor degree programs are also available.

All the degrees offered are recognized and accredited by the Lebanese Ministry of Education and Higher Education (MEHE).

== Faculties and Departments ==
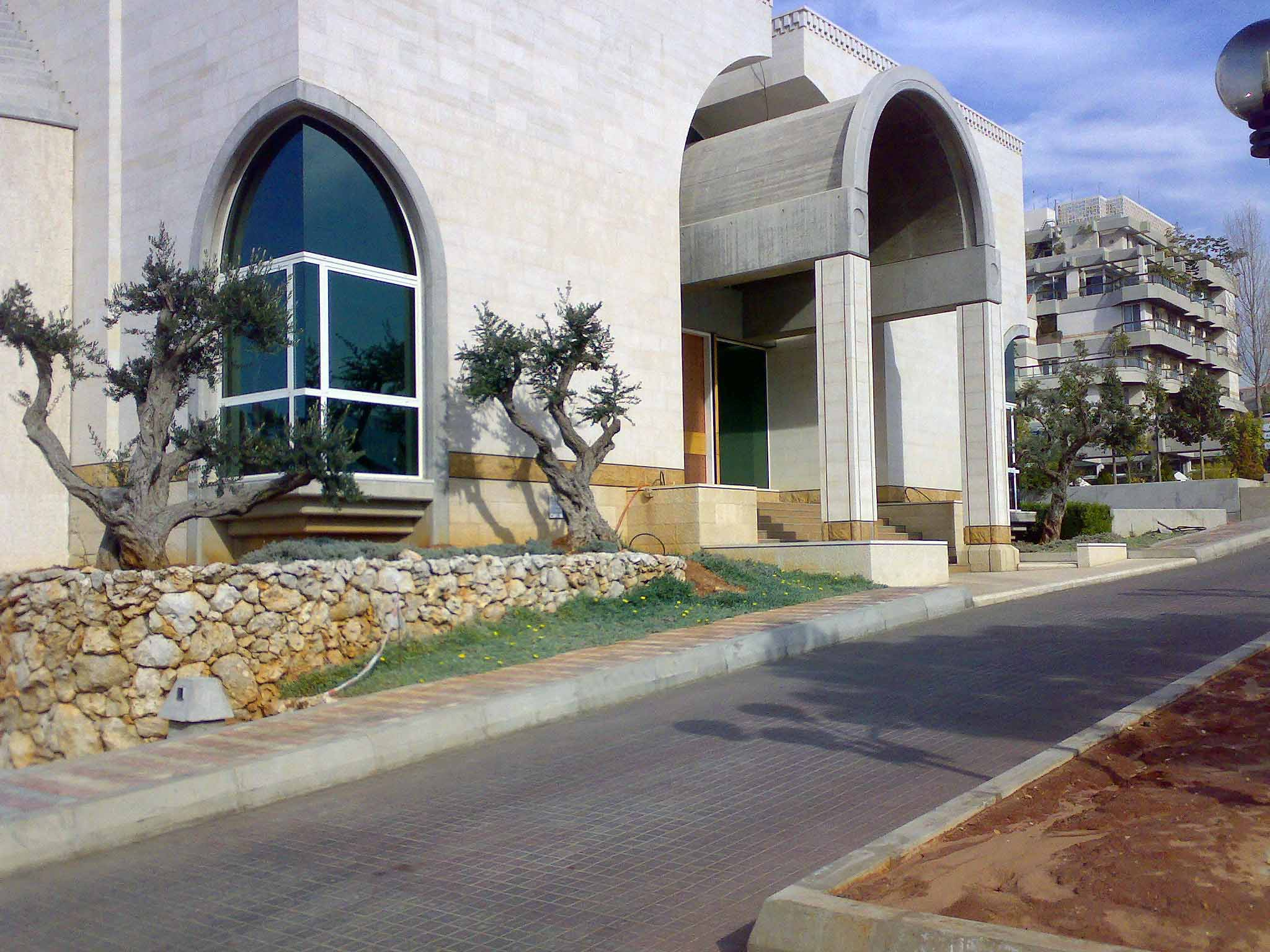
NDU Auditorium building

- Ramez G. Chaghoury Faculty of Architecture Arts & Design
  - Department of Architecture
  - Department of Design
  - Department of Music
- Faculty of Business Administration & Economics
  - Department of Economics
  - Department of Accounting and Finance
  - Department of Management and Marketing
  - Department of Hospitality and Tourism Management
- Faculty of Humanities
  - Department of English and Translation
  - Department of Psychology, Education, and Physical Education
  - Department of Media Studies
  - Department of Religious, Cultural and Philosophical Studies
- Faculty of Engineering
  - Department of Civil and Environmental Engineering
  - Department of Electrical, Computer and Communication Engineering
  - Department of Mechanical Engineering
- Faculty of Natural & Applied Sciences
  - Department of Computer Science
  - Department of Mathematics and Statistics
  - Department of Physics & Astronomy
  - Department of Sciences
- Faculty of Nursing & Health Sciences
  - Department of Nursing and Health Sciences
- Faculty of Law & Political Science
  - Department of Law
  - Department of Government and International Relations
- Lifelong Learning Center (LLC)

== Research centers ==
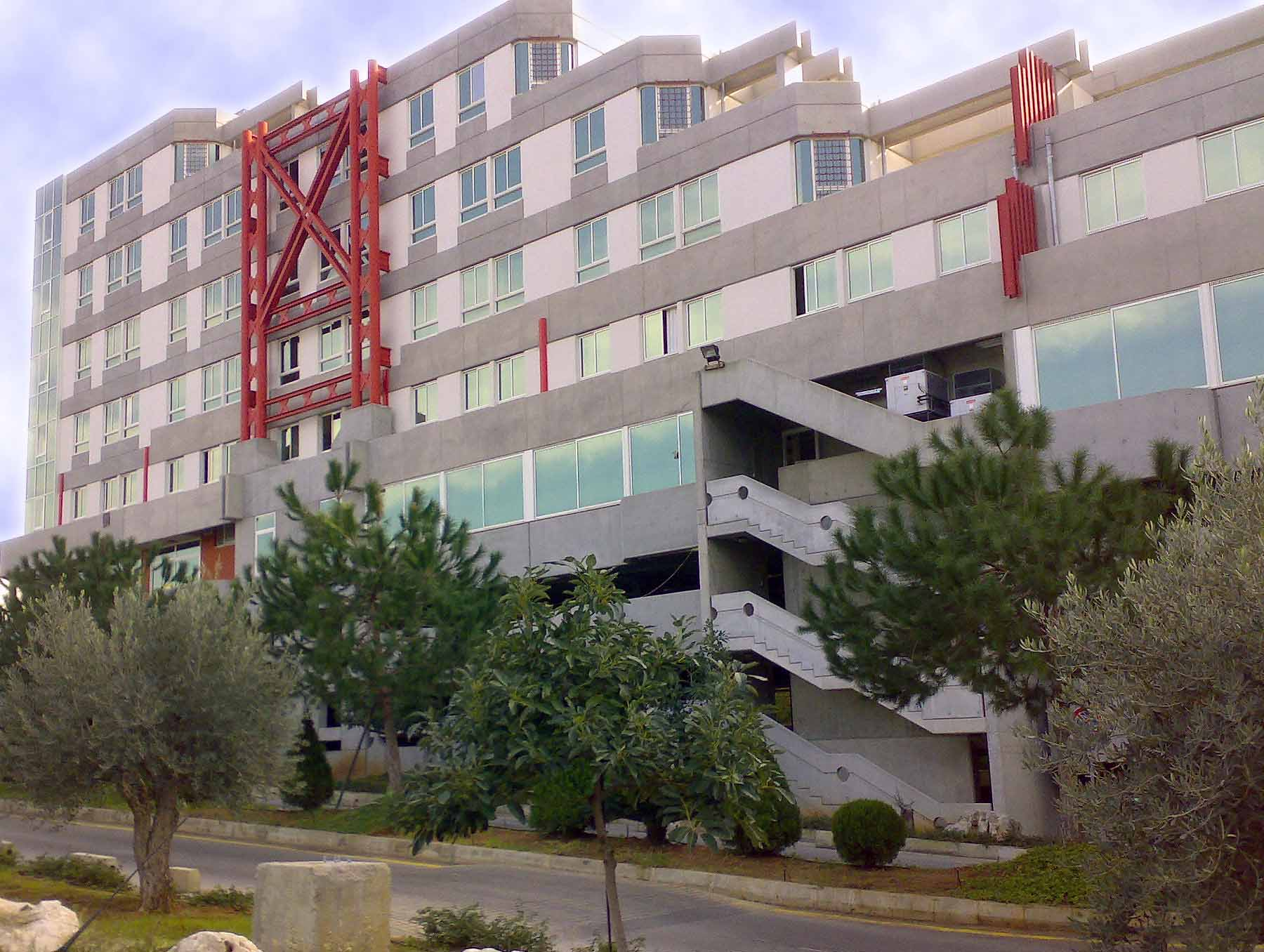
NDU Men's Residence

- Center for Applied Research in Education
- The Lebanese Emigration Research Center
- NDU Press
- Office of International Relations
- Center for Research on Sustainable Development
- The Institute of Lebanese Thought

== Campus ==
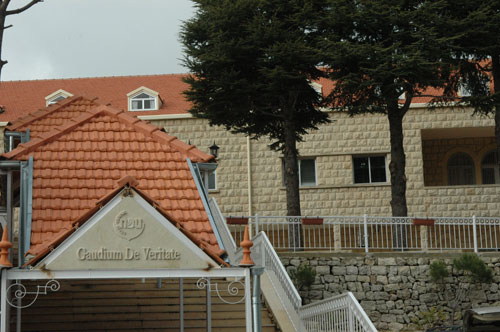
NDU Shouf Campus

Located on a land granted by the Maronite Order of the Blessed Virgin Mary and overlooking the Dog River valley, the Zouk Mosbeh campus of NDU boats one of the biggest campuses in Lebanon, with a total built area of 34,000 square meters. The Zouk Mosbeh campus is designed to accommodate approximatively 8,000 students.

The first phase of the construction project, completed in the summer of 1997 and totaling 100,000 square meters of floor space, accommodates the administration, the library, the museum, the computer center, the classrooms, the laboratories, and the restaurant. In the present phase, NDU has finished building the faculty residences, student dormitories, theater, and parking areas.

NDU has two other campuses: North Lebanon Campus (NLC) in Barsa, El Koura, and the Shouf Campus (SC) in Deir el-Kamar, Shouf.

== NDU Libraries ==
The NDU Libraries consist of the Mariam and Youssef Library at the Zouk Mosbeh Campus, the NLC Library at the Barsa Campus, the Shouf Library at the Deir El-Kamar Campus and the School of Continuing Education (SCE) Library at the Old Zouk Mosbeh Campus. The NDU Libraries are also responsible for maintaining and developing the research collections of the Benedict XVI Endowed Chair (BSEC) Library, the Center for Applied Research in Education (CARE) Library, the Institute for Lebanese Thought (ILT) Library, the Lebanese Francophonie Literature (LFL) Collection, the Lebanese Research Center for Migration and Diaspora Studies (LERC) Library, the Marian Studies Collection (MSC), and the Ramez G. Chagoury, Faculty of Architecture, Arts & Design (RC-FAAD) Room for Inspiration/Information/Ideas.

As a founding member of the Lebanese Academic Library Consortium (LALC) and the Lebanese Inter-library loan and Document delivery services Consortium (LIDS), the NDU Libraries collaborate with other Lebanese Libraries to increase access to information resources for their user communities. In addition, as a member of OCLC's WorldShare Interlibrary Loan community (OCLC symbol: LENOT) the NDU Libraries have joined with many other libraries worldwide to share resources.

The NDU Libraries are open to all users. However, only NDU faculty, students, staff, and alumni are currently granted borrowing privileges. NDU Libraries guests and visitors are allowed to access and use the library’s resources within the confines of the library only.

== International memberships ==
The university is a member of:

- Action Chrétienne en Orient, Strasbourg, France
- Association of Catholic Colleges and Universities, Washington D.C., USA
- Association of International Educators, Washington D.C., USA
- Association Internationale des Universités, Paris, France
- Comunità delle Università Méditerranée, Bary, Italy
- Council of Independent Colleges, Washington D.C., USA
- Fédération Internationale des Universités Catholiques, Paris, France
- Federation of Arab Universities, Amman, Jordan
- The College Board, USA
- The American Association of Collegiate Registrar's and Admissions Officers (AACRAO)
- The Association of International Education (NAFSA), USA
- The European Association of International Education (EAIE)
- In addition, the Faculty of Business Administration and Economics is a member of the European Council for Business Education, Brussels, Belgium.

== International Film Festival ==
Each November the university celebrates a promotes young filmmakers with a screening of their short films. The festival accepts fiction, documentaries and animated short films.
