= MCIT Library Consortium =

Cooperative library subscription network in India (est. 2005)

In India, a number of library consortia operate to share e-resources among member libraries to serve their users. The Ministry of Communications and Information Technology oversees the MCIT Library Consortium to subscribe to and share e-resources at highly discounted rates, and to extend to its services to various organisations and institutions under its umbrella. Three departments of the MCIT, namely the Department of Information Technology (DIT), the Department of Telecommunications (DOT) and the Department of Posts (DOP), administer the program. Important member consortia include the INDEST-AICTE Consortium, UGC Infonet, the CSIR Consortium, and FORSA.

Beneficiaries of the consortium include the NIC, NKN, DEITY, CDAC, DOEACC, SAMEER, STQC, STPI, ERNET INDIA, C-DOT, and others. The e-Resources currently subscribed to by the consortium are IEEE/IEE Electronic Library, ACM Digital Library, and ISO/IEC Standards.

The consortium had operated continuously since 2005. Its headquarters are at the Department of Information Technology in New Delhi.
