= Electronic Information for Libraries =

Nonprofit organization founded in 1999

Electronic Information for Libraries (EIFL)
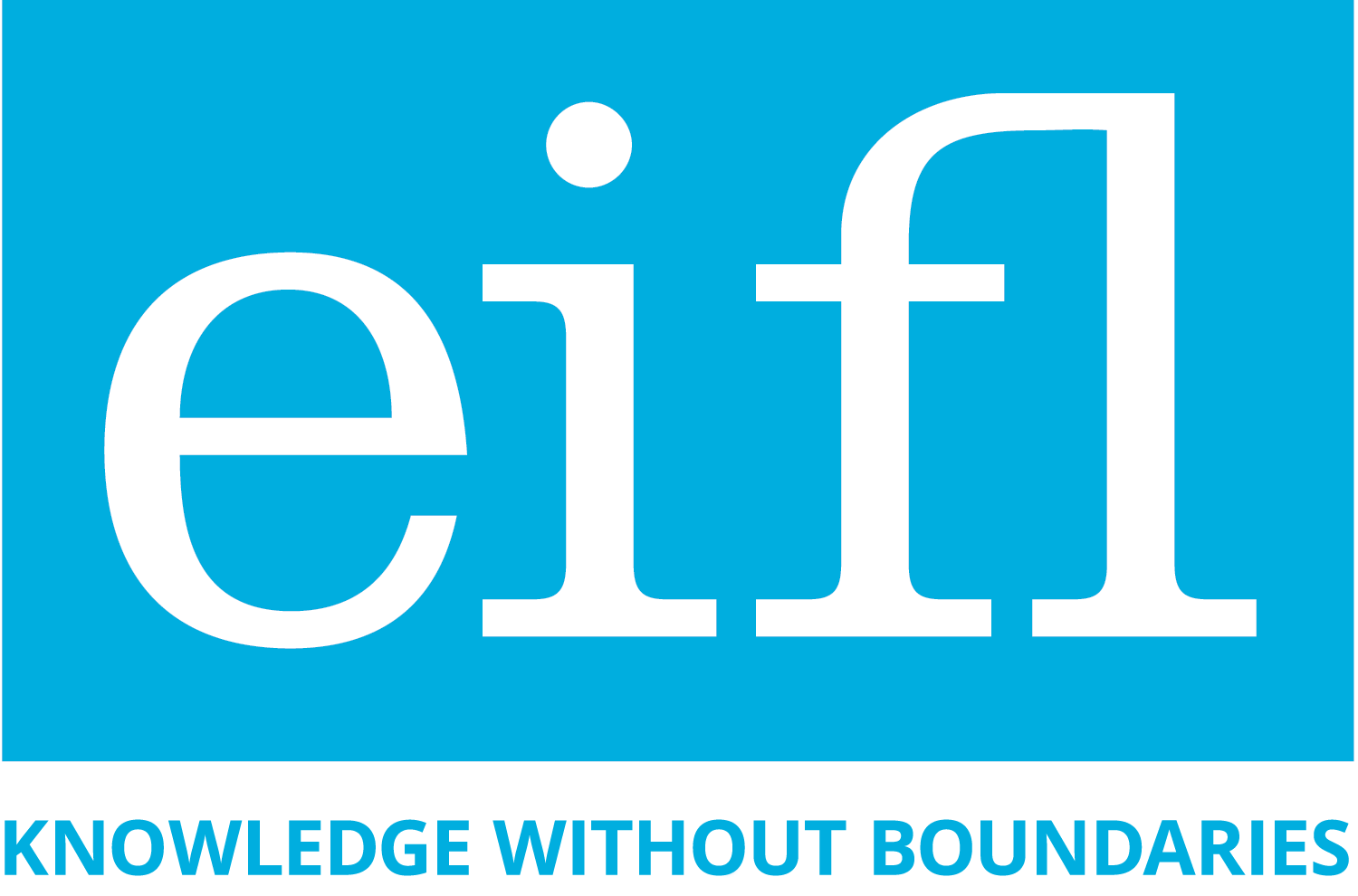
- Established: 1999; 27 years ago
- Type: Nonprofit organization
- Website: www.eifl.net

Electronic Information for Libraries (EIFL) works with libraries worldwide to enable access to digital information for people in developing and transition countries. They are an international not-for-profit organisation based in Vilnius with a global network of partners.

Founded in 1999, EIFL began by advocating for affordable access to commercial e-journals for academic and research libraries in Central and Eastern Europe. EIFL now partners with libraries and library consortia in more than 60 developing and transition countries in Africa, Asia, Europe and Latin America. Their work has expanded to include other programmes that enable access to knowledge for education, learning, research and community development.

== History ==
EIFL began as eIFL.net in 1999 as an initiative of the Open Society Institute (OSI), a private grant-making foundation that is part of the Soros Foundation network during the time that publisher Frances Pinter was head of its international publishing programme. Recognising the role that libraries play in the exchange of ideas, knowledge and information and the development of open societies, OSI invested in library development and modernisation especially in the post-socialist countries of Central and Eastern Europe and the former Soviet Union.

These countries represented emerging markets for international providers of scholarly and academic information. However, the barriers to access were formidable with little money to pay for expensive electronic resources, poor technological infrastructures, lack of capacity and little awareness of electronic alternatives to print subscriptions. This deprived libraries of the wealth of international academic journals and databases and the opportunities of digital technologies.

OSI through EIFL aimed to assist libraries and their users in achieving access to electronic scholarly resources. EIFL negotiates licences with publishers for electronic resources on behalf of its members. As access to Internet-based digital material can be expanded at marginal cost to the provider, the idea is to leverage the purchasing power of individually "poor" customers and negotiate a multi-country consortial deal with information providers. EIFL acts as an agent for the national library consortia, who manages promotion and use of the electronic resources locally. Libraries and their users have access to thousands of full-text academic and scholarly journals from the arts to zoology through EIFL licences.

In 2002, EIFL became an independent foundation registered in the Netherlands with its operational seat in Rome, Italy.

EIFL is a member of the International Federation of Library Associations and Institutions (IFLA), International Coalition of Library Consortia (ICOLC), Healthcare Information For All (HIFA), and African Library and Information Associations and Institutions (AfLIA). EIFL is a founding member of the Confederation of Open Access Repositories (COAR) and signatory of the Copyright for Creativity.

== Approach ==
EIFL's approach is to partner with libraries organised into national library consortia – groups of libraries that share common goals – thereby effectively reaching millions of people. Consortia include university, research and public libraries, and other institutions. At EIFL:

- They organize training events, developing tools and resources, and providing information on issues that affect access to knowledge,
- They advocate for access to knowledge nationally and internationally,
- They encourage knowledge sharing through peer-to-peer learning, best practice case studies, an annual partner conference and regional cooperation among consortia,
- They incubate pilot projects for public library services.

== Partner countries ==
As of 2024, EIFL worked with partnerships in 56 developing and transition countries in Africa, Asia, Europe and Latin America. To see the list go to www.eifl.net/where-we-work

Africa (19, incl. South Africa, Nigeria, and Sudan)

Asia (14, incl. China, Palestine, and Syria)

Europe (21, incl. Hungary, Romania, and Poland)

Latin (2): Chile, Colombia
