= Midwest Transportation Knowledge Network =

The Midwest Transportation Libraries Consortium, which became the Midwest Transportation Knowledge Network (MTKN), was founded in December 2001 through the sponsorship of the National Transportation Library (NTL) and the efforts of Midwestern transportation libraries. Its mission is to “increase collaboration among the region’s transportation libraries and information centers so managers, engineers, and planners are better able to find and apply the most recent, credible, validated technical information to their current projects.” Today, members include the libraries of DOTs in nine states—Illinois, Iowa, Kansas, Michigan, Minnesota, Missouri, Ohio, South Dakota, and Wisconsin; three university libraries—those of Northwestern University, the University of Michigan Transportation Research Institute, and the University of Minnesota Center for Transportation Studies; the corporate libraries of Hanson Professional Services, the Portland Cement Association, Packer Engineering and Wiss, Janney, Elstner Associates; and NTL.

MTKN increased its ability to accept different types of organizations by creating 'Affiliate' and 'Friends' levels of membership. The intention was to formally include information partners to MTKN, even though they may not be a full service information center. As of 2010, the Mid-Ohio Regional Planning Commission (MORPC) is an Affiliate member of MTKN, while the Wisconsin Transportation Center (UW-Madison campus) is currently a Friend of MTKN. In 2004 NTL launched TL Cat in collaboration with the libraries of MTKN and OCLC. MTKN members also played a role in helping NTL and the National Highway Institute develop a distance-learning workshop entitled “Working Smarter: Using the World Wide Web for Transportation-Related Research.”

MTKN posted its website that year, helped strengthen libraries in three state DOTs and lobbied to keep a fourth, supported the state pooled-fund study discussed in the text, and conducted a member survey to determine next steps. After its 2004 annual meeting, MTKN incorporated as a nonprofit organization and revised its committee structure in support of new strategic goals, including facilitating the development of other regional networks and a national network; developing shared marketing and training tools through templates to be customized by each member; helping save libraries from elimination; mentoring new librarians; and developing new partnerships with other transportation organizations, such as American Association of State Highway and Transportation Officials (AASHTO) and the Local Technical Assistance Program. MTKN also played an important part in creating both the Eastern Transportation Knowledge Network (ETKN) and Western Transportation Knowledge Network (WTKN).

The benefits of MTKN include
• Multiplication of cost savings from finding transportation information more rapidly, more completely, and at lower cost than can practitioners
• Improved access by practitioners to research and new technology
• Pooling of catalogued transportation materials in a single catalogue through TL Cat
• Sharing of resources (rapid, low-cost interlibrary loans) and expertise in capturing, cataloguing, and disseminating information in printed and electronic formats
• Expert searching through means not accessible by general Internet search tools and instruction of interested practitioners in better search techniques
