= Michigan Library Consortium =

On February 15, 2010, the Michigan Library Consortium (MLC) merged with INCOLSA to form the Midwest Collaborative for Library Services (MCLS). MCLS is a non-profit membership organization composed of various types of libraries from Indiana and Michigan. MCLS provides libraries a convenient, single point of contact for training, group purchasing and technical support for electronic resources.

== See also ==
- Midwest Collaborative for Library Services (MCLS) website.
