= Nylink =

- Formerly: SUNY/OCLC Network
- Type: Nonprofit membership cooperative
- Industry: Library services
- Founded: 1973 in Albany
- Defunct: 2011
- Headquarters: Albany, New York, United States
- Area served: New York State
- Key people: David Penniman(Executive Director)
- Products: WorldCat, NetLibrary, FirstSearch, Electronic Databases, Cataloging, Training, Resource Sharing, Interlibrary Loan, eBooks, eAudiobooks, LAND
- Members: More than 3,000 libraries and cultural heritage institutions
- Number of employees: 25

Nylink was a non-profit, totally member-supported cooperative serving libraries and cultural heritage organizations of all types. Based in Albany, New York, Nylink included members located in New York State and surrounding areas. At its peak, Nylink's 300-plus member institutions included academic libraries, public libraries, library systems, corporate libraries, court libraries, government agency libraries, gardens, museums and other cultural heritage organizations. Additionally, Nylink had more than 2,000 affiliate institutions who participated in or acquired Nylink's services.

Nylink announced in May, 2010, that the organization would phase out its operations over the next 12 months, with permanent closure planned for May 2011. Though it was technically a part of the State University of New York System, Nylink was required to be self-sufficient on the fees paid by its members. Citing changes in its business environment as the reason it could no longer remain self-supporting, Nylink ceased operations in July 2011.

== History ==
Nylink was founded in 1973 as the SUNY/OCLC Network, providing access and support to OCLC's core services (cataloging and resource sharing) for New York State libraries. Originating as one of fifteen regional service providers (RSPs) for OCLC, it was developed to provide personalized support for a suite of OCLC services. In April 1999, the SUNY/OCLC Network changed its name to Nylink to reflect its more diverse membership and services.

Nylink was governed by the Nylink Advisory Board, made up of representatives from all constituencies of Nylink members, elected by the membership.

== Collaboration ==
Nylink's mission was "Supporting Libraries through Collaboration and Innovation,” accomplished by working with other NYS library organizations and other regional service providers as well as working for libraries to provide training, support, and advocacy.

- 2000: Nylink secured an IMLS grant to start Nylink's IT Fluency Institute. The Fluency Institute developed into a year-round continuing education program. Nylink's professional development where information technology is only one component, is available to staff as face-to-face classes throughout New York, and anytime and anywhere as online classes.
- 2001: Nylink was a voting member of the NISO standard Z39.85-2001, “Dublin Core Metadata Standard”. The Dublin Core metadata standard has become a mainstay in the library community to describe digital objects.
- 2006: Nylink and eleven other OCLC networks joined to form the Network Education Exchange (NEE) . Through this agreement, Nylink members can take training classes at any other OCLC network at member rates.

Nylink partnered with the Northeast Document Conservation Center, ENY/ACRL, the Eastern New York division of the Association of college and Research Libraries, the Association for Library Collections and Technical Services (ALCT), LITA, the Library and Information Technology Association, and many other organization to provide training for librarians and information professionals.

Nylink worked with the New York State Library Association, participating on the conference program committee, NYLA sections and by supporting its annual conference as an exhibitor.

Nylink worked with the New York State Higher Education Initiative (NYSHEI), negotiating an Elsevier contract for NYSHEI and Nylink to provide a substantial cost saving for New York libraries.

Nylink worked with New York's 3Rs Councils (NY3R's) to support NYS libraries, collaborating on training, providing access to databases, cataloging, and resource sharing.

== Resource sharing across New York ==
LAND , a statewide ground delivery service for transporting materials between participating libraries, was created and administered by Nylink. For a flat annual rate, LAND participants could send and receive an unlimited number of items. This service was available through December 2010.

In January 2004, Nylink began working with SUNY Geneseo to support the Information Delivery Service (IDS) pilot program. The IDS Project is a cooperative resource sharing system designed to implement and evaluate a set of common transaction objectives, policies, and procedures among participating libraries that will help optimize mutual access to the information resources contained within those libraries. The foundation of the project is based upon each participating library meeting the performance standards outlined in the IDS Project contract, using the OCLC ILLiad Resource Sharing Management System and the LAND Delivery System. IDS gained attention nationwide through the ATLAS ILLiad conferences.

== Additional services ==
Nylink continued to offer databases, e-books and journals, online encyclopedias, and other electronic resources to libraries at discounted rates until 2011. Nylink served as the administrator on behalf of libraries, working with vendors, providing the libraries with fiscal services and support, and offered consulting services on a wide range of subject areas.
