= TRAILS =

American academic library consortium

Treasure State Academic Information & Library Services
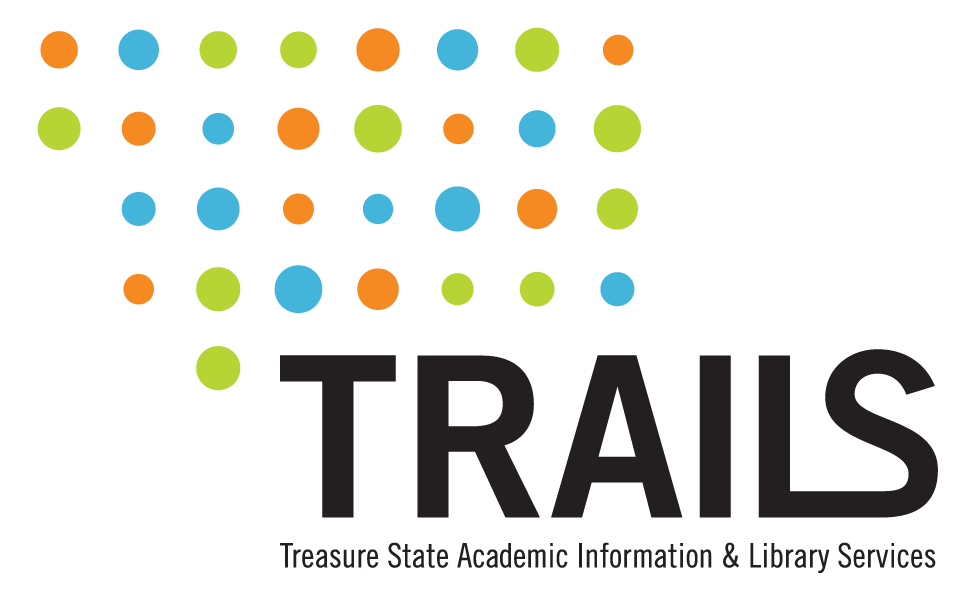
- Abbreviation: TRAILS
- Formation: 2016
- Type: Statewide consortium of academic libraries
- Purpose: Increasing efficiency and improving access to resources for students, researchers, and communities in Montana
- Executive Director: Pamela Benjamin
- Website: trailsmt.org

In Montana, TRAILS (Treasure State Academic Information & Library Services) is a statewide consortium of academic libraries which includes 23 of Montana's institutions - public, private, tribal and community colleges, and the Montana University System, plus the Montana State Library. TRAILS serves over 49,500 students, faculty, researchers and community members, providing access to over 4,000,000 library items.

== History ==
In May 2014, Montana State University Library dean Kenning Arlitsch and University of Montana IT head and library system administrator John Greer proposed a unified content management system for Montana's academic libraries to the university's board of regents. The proposal was accepted unanimously. That year, funding was requested from the Montana Legislature. Although no legislative funding was awarded, the consortium officially launched in 2016 with the aims of increasing efficiency and improving access to resources for the students, researchers, and communities of Montana. By negotiating with vendors for consortium members, TRAILS provides students and faculty with access to journals, databases, and other resources which might not otherwise have been affordable. In addition to sharing resources and negotiating better prices for materials, in 2017 the consortium negotiated the purchase of the Alma cloud-based library-services platform from Ex Libris Ltd which increases efficiency and resource-sharing (allowing users to search 17 libraries in the system simultaneously). TRAILS, with support from the Montana Office of the Commissioner of Higher Education, has initiated a statewide program for open educational resources (OER) program, such as free online textbooks. The Northwest Commission on Colleges and Universities praised the Montana State University Library's leadership of the TRAILS program in 2017, and the MSU Library was named the 2018 Library of the Year by the Montana Library Association. The consortium consists of 24 institutions across the state. TRAILS includes all institutions in the Montana University System (MUS), the state's seven tribal colleges, and four private colleges. A memorandum of understanding was finalized by September 9, 2017, and operating procedures were approved on January 22, 2018. TRAILS is governed by a general council, which includes one representative of each institution. Officers include a chairperson and secretary, who serve two-year terms. Ex officio, non-voting representatives include the TRAILS coordinator and a representative of the Montana state librarian. Since the consortium's inception, its executive director has been Pamela Benjamin. TRAILS has five standing committees (collection development, digital preservation, OverDrive, open educational resources and professional development) and five technology sub-committees: cataloging, discovery, e-resources, fulfillment and resource sharing.

== Member institutions ==
- Aaniiih Nakoda College
- Blackfeet Community College
- Carroll College
- Chief Dull Knife College
- Dawson Community College
- Flathead Valley Community College
- Fort Peck Community College
- Great Falls College Montana State University
- Helena College - University of Montana
- Little Big Horn College
- Miles Community College
- Montana State Library
- Montana State University – Bozeman
- Montana State University – Billings
- Montana State University – Northern
- Salish Kootenai College
- Stone Child College
- Rocky Mountain College
- University of Montana – Law Library
- University of Montana – Missoula Maureen and Mike Mansfield Library
- University of Montana – Montana Tech
- University of Montana – Western
- University of Providence
