= Missouri Library Network Corporation =

American library consortium

Missouri Library Network Corporation (MLNC)
- Founded: 1981
- Dissolved: 2012
- Type: Nonprofit membership cooperative
- Purpose: Library Services
- Location: St. Louis, Missouri
- Region served: National
- Members: 320
- Key people: Tracy Rochow Byerly, Executive Director
- Employees: 4
- Website: mlnc.org

The Missouri Library Network Corporation (MLNC) was a library consortium founded on October 19, 1981 by the representatives of thirty-one Missouri libraries.

In July 2012, MLNC merged with Amigos Library Services of Dallas Texas.

== History and purpose ==
The Missouri Library Network Corporation (MLNC) was founded on October 19, 1981 by the representatives of thirty-one Missouri libraries. The mission of the Missouri Library Network Corporation (MLNC) was to organize and deliver to its member libraries and other contracting entities OCLC-based information services, related electronic services and content, and training in the management and use of information.

MLNC's primary role from 1983 to 2009 was to provide OCLC services to Missouri libraries. They were an active OCLC partner that provided billing, marketing, and training services to libraries throughout the Midwest region. In addition, MLNC provided discounts on a variety of library-related products and services, including electronic reference databases from vendors such as LexisNexis, Oxford University Press, Congressional Quarterly, and others as well as library supply catalogs (such as Demco and Brodart).

== Continuing education ==
MLNC offered workshops on library-related topics including:

- OCLC WorldCat Resource Sharing
- OCLC Connexion client and browser
- Descriptive cataloging
- Library management and administration
- Digitization
- Emerging technologies
- Collection management

MLNC staff contracted with libraries and statewide organizations for keynote and professional speaking engagements such as in-house training, staff development events and other library programs.

== Membership ==
MLNC was a membership organization. There were three levels of membership:

- Participant: Enabled a library to participate in MLNC Cooperative Purchasing/Electronic Resources Programs (Library Supplier Discounts, e-Resources, etc.)
- Associate: Included all the benefits of the "Participant" level, as well as receiving discounts on workshop registrations, and access to the MLNC Custom Cataloging service.
- Full: Included all the benefits of the "Participant" and "Associate" levels, as well as institutional credits for training, and the right to participate in the governance of the organization.

== Media outlets and social networking ==
In addition to their website, MLNC had a presence on Facebook and Twitter, a monthly newsletter, QuickFlash, and the organization maintained a Listserv for corporate and product news.
