= Saudi Digital Library =

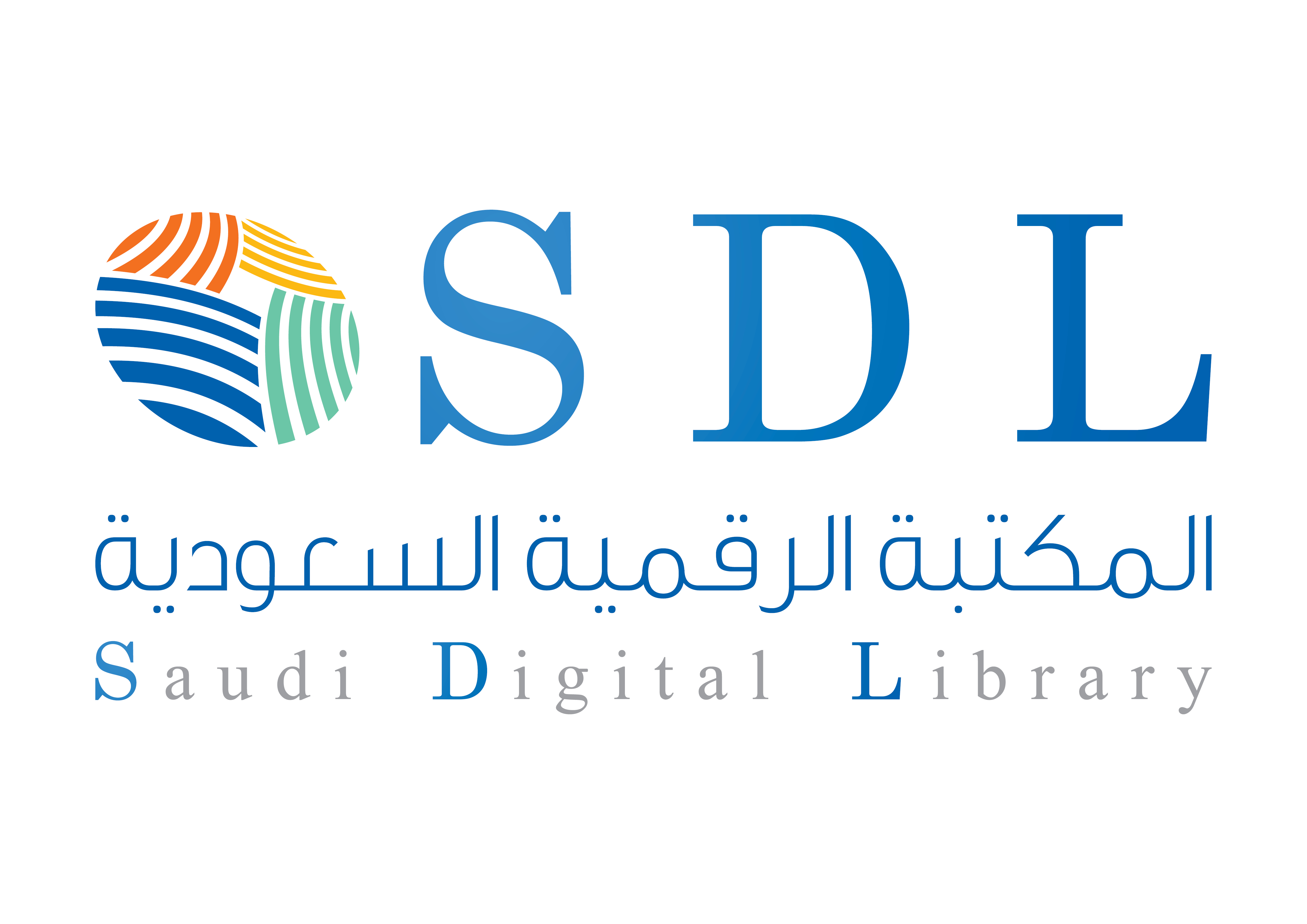

The Saudi Digital Library is a national online digital library resource in Saudi Arabia. It is the largest source of academic information in the Arab world. It includes more than 310,000 references. The resource was established by the National Center for E-Learning, part of the Saudi Ministry of Higher Education.
