= International Nuclear Library Network =

Consortium of libraries on nuclear information

International Nuclear Library Network (INLN)
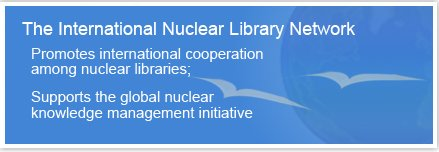
- INLN moto
- Abbreviation: INLN
- Formation: 2005
- Type: Consortium of Nuclear Libraries/Knowledge Centres
- Legal status: Active
- Location: Vienna, Austria (IAEA Library)
- Region served: Worldwide
- Members: Nuclear Libraries
- Key people: Giannakopoulos, Thanos
- Parent organization: IAEA
- Website: http://inln.iaea.org

The International Nuclear Library Network (INLN), coordinated by the IAEA Library, i.e. the Library of the International Atomic Energy Agency, is a consortium of nuclear libraries and knowledge centres. The Network seeks to promote the exchange of nuclear information and to strengthen strategic partnerships amongst members. The underlying strategy is twofold: first, whenever a new partner joins the network, the shared information base is enlarged; and second, the larger the information base becomes, the more attractive the network is. The 37 nuclear libraries coming from 27 countries that participate in the coalition have managed to enhance their information pool and extend their services to cover nuclear information and knowledge needs on a global scale.

== History ==
The International Nuclear Library Network was founded in 2005 by the IAEA Library and the Atomic Energy of Canada Limited (AECL) Library. In its initial years, it counted a total of five members (in addition to the initiators, the National Atomic Energy Commission of Argentina, the Turkish Atomic Energy Agency and the Institute of Nuclear Physics of Uzbekistan Academy of Science. In 2006, the Australian Nuclear Science and Technology Organisation (ANSTO) also joined the network. In 2007, the INLN welcomed four new members: the China Nuclear Information Centre, the Nigerian Nuclear Regulatory Authority, the Obninsk State Technical University for Nuclear Power Engineering in the Russian Federation, and the Russian Association of Nuclear Science and Education (RANSE), thus increasing the membership to ten participants. In 2008, at the meeting of INLN Members and prospective members, during the 34th International Nuclear Information System (INIS) Liaison Officers Meeting in Vienna, a large number of nuclear libraries from around the world expressed their interest and subsequently joined the INLN: the Belarus INIS Center, Chair of Ecological Information Systems, the Nuclear Research Institute Rez plc of Czech Republic, the Egyptian Atomic Energy Authority (EAEA), the Ghana Atomic Energy Commission Library, the Bhabha Atomic Research Centre (BARC) of India, the Radiological Protection Institute of Ireland, the Japan Atomic Energy Agency (JAEA), the Instituto Nacional de Investigaciones Nucleares (ININ), Centro de Información y Documentación Nuclear (CIDN) of Mexico, the Centre National de l' Energie des Sciences et des Techniques Nucléaires (CNESTEN) of Morocco, the Korea Atomic Energy Research Institute (KAERI) at the Korea University of Science and Technology, the Vinca Nuclear Institute of Serbia, the Centre National des Sciences et Technologies Nucléaires (CNSTN) of Tunisia. In November of the same year, the Library Network of the Brazilian Nuclear Energy Commission (Comissão Nacional de Energia Nuclear – CNEN), consisting of seven nuclear libraries, became an INLN official member. In January 2009, the Commissariat à l'Énergie Atomique (CEA) - Centre de Saclay - Centre de Ressources Documentaires joined the Network, while in 2010, the National Atomic Energy Commission, the Norwegian Radiation Protection Authority, and the Pakistan Institute of Nuclear Science & Technology decided to become INLN members. The Nuclear Energy Regulatory Agency of Indonesia - Badan Pengawas Tenaga Nuklir and the New Zealand Institute of Environmental Science and Research – National Radiation Laboratory are the newest members, raising the total number of Nuclear Libraries/Information Centres participating in the INLN to 37.

== Structure and function ==
The International Nuclear Library Network (INLN) represents a coalition of nuclear libraries. It is designed to be an Internet-based library and information system. Its information portal is hosted by the IAEA Library and it is supported by nuclear libraries and knowledge centres worldwide; it is developed and maintained in a decentralized manner, in accordance with agreed standards. It links not only bibliographic information to full-text and audio-visual information, but also librarians, library clients and researchers to the appropriate information. Moreover, the network links nuclear information workers to each other, forming a strong community of practice, sharing knowledge, best practices and lessons learned. Among the services that INLN members provide to each other are: research services, interlibrary loans, document delivery, current awareness services and any other services participating libraries wish to provide other libraries. The website offers a landing page hosting access to members' online catalogues. The success of INLN is based on its democratic structure: all participating libraries are equal partners, valued according to what they bring as practitioners in terms of information and their willingness to share, rather than on predetermined hierarchical or status levels. The actual work of the network focuses on concrete actions, bringing the right information in the right format at the right time to the right place.

== Membership ==
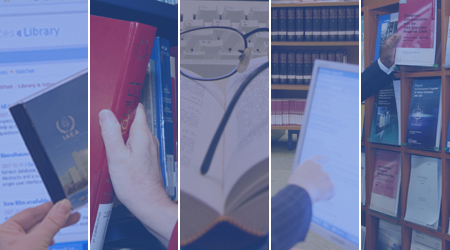
INLN services

Membership in the INLN is open to States who are Members of the IAEA and to UN organizations. Other interested international, intergovernmental and non-governmental organizations may also join, subject to agreement of the INLN Members. Each INLN Member has the same rights and responsibilities. To apply for INLN membership, an official request is to be made by the appropriate library to the IAEA Library, which is the coordinating library of the Network. If the requesting library is located in an IAEA Member State or belongs to an UN organization, the IAEA Library as the coordinating library will make modifications to the INLN website and inform the applicant and other participants about a new member. For other prospective participants, the coordinating library will seek approval from all existing member libraries/knowledge centres. The Coordinator, after receiving the approval from current members, will inform the applicant and the members of the outcome, and proceed with updating the INLN website.

== Country members and institutions' external links ==
Country	Institution
Argentina	Comision Nacional de Energia Atomica
Australia	Australian Nuclear Science and Technology Organisation (ANSTO)
Austria	Österreichische Zentralbibliothek für Physik - Austrian Central Library for Physics
Belarus	Belarus INIS Center, Chair of Ecological Information Systems
Estado Plurinacional de Bolivia	Instituto Boliviano de Ciencia y Tecnología Nuclear (IBTEN)
Brazil	Library Network of the Brazilian Nuclear Energy Commission, Comissão Nacional de Energia Nuclear – CNEN): CDTN - Biblioteca do Centro de Desenvolvimento da Tecnologia Nuclear; CRCN-CO - Biblioteca do Centro Regional de Ciências Nucleares - Centro-Oeste; CRCN-NE - Biblioteca do Centro Regional de Ciências Nucleares - Nordeste; IEN - Biblioteca do Instituto de Engenharia Nuclear; IPEN - Biblioteca Terezine Arantes Ferraz; IRD - Biblioteca do Instituto de Radioproteção e Dosimetria; SEDE – Centro de Informações Nucleares
Canada	Atomic Energy of Canada Limited (AECL)
People's Republic of China	China Nuclear Information Center
Czech Republic	Nuclear Research Institute Rez plc
Egypt	Egyprtian Atomic Energy Authority
France	Commissariat à l'Énergie Atomique (CEA) - Centre de Saclay, Centre de Ressources Documentaires (STI/SVI/CRD)
Ghana	Ghana Atomic Energy Commission Library
India	Bhabha Atomic Research Centre (BARC)
Indonesia	Nuclear Energy Regulatory Agency of Indonesia
(Republic of Ireland) Ireland	Radiological Protection Institute of Ireland
Japan	Japan Atomic Energy Agency (JAEA)
(South Korea) Korea, Republic of	Korea Atomic Energy Research Institute (KAERI)
Mexico	Instituto Nacional de Investigaciones Nucleares (ININ)- Centro de Información y Documentación Nuclear (CIDN)
Morocco	Centre National de L' Energie des Sciences et des Techniques Nucléaires (CNESTEN)
New Zealand	Institute for Environmental Science and research - National Radiation Laboratory
Nigeria	Nigerian Nuclear Regulatory Authority
Norway	Norwegian Radiation Protection Authority
Pakistan	Pakistan Institute of Nuclear Science and Technology (PAEC)
(Russia) Russian Federation	Obninsk State Technical University for Nuclear Power Engineering; Russian Association of Nuclear Science and Education
Serbia	Institute of Nuclear Sciences 'VINČA' of Serbia
Tunisia	Centre National des Sciences et Technologies Nucléaires (CNSTN)
Turkey	Turkish Atomic Energy Agency
Uzbekistan	Institute of Nuclear Physics of Uzbekistan

== Other external links ==
- International Nuclear Library Network (INLN) official website
- IAEA Library official website
- IAEA official website
