= Amigos Library Services =

American not-for-profit organization serving libraries

Amigos Library Services, Inc.
- Formation: 1974; 52 years ago
- Type: library consortium, non-profit organization
- Purpose: Library services
- Location: Dallas, Texas, United States
- Website: www.amigos.org

Amigos Library Services, Inc. is a membership-based American not-for-profit organization chartered to serve libraries. The organization was formed in 1974 in Dallas, Texas, as the AMIGOS Bibliographic Council. It included 22 libraries, united to bring OCLC access to the southwestern United States. As of September 2021 Amigos is one of the largest library resource-sharing networks and a provider of information technology to libraries.

In July 2012, Amigos merged with Missouri Library Network Corporation (MLNC), an organization similar to Amigos headquartered in St. Louis. The action followed votes to approve the merger in April 2012 by MLNC members and May 2012 by Amigos members.

The combined organization retained the Amigos name with Dallas as its headquarters and an office in the St. Louis area. The new organization became the largest library network west of the Mississippi River, comprising libraries and cultural heritage institutions in 22 states.

Amigos Library Services is similar in scope to other library-oriented consortia such as the Midwest Collaborative for Library Services, OhioNet, and Lyrasis.
