= CAPES Periodicals Portal =

Brazilian digital library tool

The CAPES Periodicals Portal is a Brazilian digital library tool that provides access to various academic content in electronic format, like texts available in more than 45,000 periodical publications (national and international), various databases that bring together academic and scientific works, as well as patents, theses and dissertations, among other types of materials, covering all areas of knowledge.

== Background ==
It was officially created by the Coordination for the Improvement of Higher Education Personnel (CAPES) , a foundation of the Ministry of Education (MEC) , on November 11, 2000. The periodicals portal was developed with the intention of strengthening postgraduate programs in Brazil through the democratization of online access to scientific information.

== Access ==
Professors, researchers, students, and staff from institutions linked to the project have free and open access to the CAPES Periodicals Portal. The portal can be accessed via computers connected to the internet within the institutions that are part of the project or remotely using a username and password; this latter method is called CAFE access (Federated Academic Community). The following institutions can access the CAPES Periodicals Portal free of charge :

1. Federal institutions of higher education;
2. Research units with postgraduate programs, evaluated by CAPES with a grade of 4 (four) or higher;
3. State and municipal public higher education institutions with postgraduate programs evaluated by CAPES with a grade of 4 (four) or higher;
4. Private higher education institutions with at least one doctoral program rated 5 (five) or higher by CAPES;
5. Institutions with graduate programs recommended by CAPES and that meet the excellence criteria defined by the Ministry of Education (MEC).

Those who wish to access the Periodicals Portal and are not affiliated with a partner institution can contact the library of the nearest participating institution. Service will be provided according to the conditions established by the contracts signed between CAPES and the publishers that are part of the Portal.

The CAPES Portal also offers free access to high-quality content, including national and international databases selected by the Portal's team. References to theses and dissertations produced in postgraduate programs throughout Brazil and Brazilian journals with a good Qualis-CAPES rating are also available. In other words, in addition to restricted access resources, the Portal provides other freely accessible resources; simply being connected to the internet is enough to access them.

== See also ==
- List of libraries in Brazil
