= National Research Libraries Alliance =

The National Research Libraries Alliance (NRLA) (often pronounced NAR-la) was formed in 1997 by four US Government research libraries in order to "provide their research communities with a common core of scientific information." To this end, the libraries of the NASA Goddard Space Flight Center, National Institute of Standards and Technology (NIST), National Science Foundation (NSF), and Naval Research Laboratory (NRL) sought and licensed consortium use of Science Citation Index Expanded via Web of Science, produced by the Institute for Scientific Information (ISI).

As new members joined, the NRLA expanded its goals in order:

1. To broker the best prices for products and services for NRLA members and to allow members a better return on investment.

2. To improve information services and support through increased resource sharing among NRLA libraries.

3. To ensure that all NRLA members have seamless and timely access to procured information resources and services regardless of their geographic location.

4. To develop and maintain the necessary technical and administrative infrastructure for improved and timely access to NRLA resources.

5. To promote, through innovative leadership, creative approaches to acquiring and sharing information products and services among NRLA libraries.

The core of shared scientific information for NRLA remains the TORPEDO Ultra digital library system of millions of licensed journal and conference articles hosted at NRL.
