= TexShare =

The TexShare program is a statewide resource-sharing consortium of hundreds of member libraries in Texas, United States administered by the Texas State Library and Archives Commission (TSLAC). The TexShare program maximizes the effectiveness of library expenditures by enabling member libraries to share staff expertise, share materials electronic and print formats, pursue joint purchasing agreements on electronic databases, and encourage the cooperative development of Texas libraries statewide. TexShare is made up of Texas academic libraries, public libraries, and libraries of clinical medicine. TexShare is a member driven consortium that exists with the support and cooperation of Texas member libraries.

== History ==
The idea of a statewide resource sharing project in Texas was first proposed by Texas academic library directors in 1988. The original group of TexShare members consisted of 53 publicly supported four year academic and medical libraries, with the Texas Higher Education Coordinating Board providing funds starting in fiscal year 1994.

The beginning years of TexShare were devoted to planning and starting cooperative resource sharing initiatives such as funding for Internet connectivity and interlibrary loan workstations, creating protocols, leveraging costs for online resources, fostering a statewide library card program, and offering grants. Administrative duties were contracted out to Amigos Library Services and the University of Texas at Austin.

Between 1997 and 1999, legislative statute expanded TexShare membership to include independent academic institutions, community colleges, and public libraries. In 1999 the Texas State Library and Archives Commission assumed full administrative responsibility for TexShare, with Amigos and University of Texas at Austin continuing to provide vital logistical and technical support as Strategic Partners. Legislative statute again expanded TexShare membership in 2001 to include libraries of clinical medicine, and in 2005, another legislative statute granted the Texas State Library and Archives Commission authority to negotiate group purchasing agreements on behalf of Texas K-12 public school libraries.

== Governance ==
The TexShare Advisory Board provides administrative guidance, and is composed of representatives from community colleges, private universities, publicly funded academic institutions, public libraries, and two representatives of the general public.

TexShare Working Groups provide member input on the policies and operations of each TexShare program. The working groups are composed of librarians chosen to represent the various constituent groups and geographic diversity within TexShare.

== Programs ==
Two of the current programs of TexShare available through Texas libraries are:

- TexShare Databases - Registered users of Texas libraries have these online research tools available to them both inside the library and 24-hour-a-day access outside the library in their homes or offices. The TexShare online resources provide full-text articles from journals, newspapers, magazines, and many other sources, on-line books, and topics such as homework help for students, health information, business information, biography and genealogy, as well as literature and archival information. Library users can access these online resources a variety of ways, either through library specific interfaces or through the Library of Texas interface.
- TexShare Card – Eligible registered users of Texas libraries obtain this card to check out books and other physical materials from the collections of TexShare member libraries across the State of Texas. Each library creates individual lending policies as guidelines for TexShare Card owners. Greater access to collections statewide is a major benefit to the user.

TexShare works closely with other programs offered by the Texas State Library and Archives Commission, including the TexQuest Program for K-12 public and open enrollment schools, statewide Inter-library Loan program, grants programs (particularly the signature TexTreasures Grant), and the E-Read Texas e-books program.

TexShare is a member of the International Coalition of Library Consortia.
