= New York Area Theological Library Association =

Library association in the New York City area

The New York Area Theological Library Association (NYATLA) was formed in 1977 and consists of universities and seminary libraries within the metropolitan New York area. It is a regional chapter of ATLA.

Faculty, librarians and students in theology or religious studies from NYATLA institutions are welcome to use each other's libraries. The association meets several times a year and operates under a constitution and bylaws.
