= Washington Research Library Consortium =

US library consortium in Washington metropolitan area

- 38.87530161414513°N 76.72756410109851°W
- Location: Marlboro, Maryland, United States
- Established: 1987

Other information
- Website: www.wrlc.org

The Washington Research Library Consortium (WRLC) was established as a non-profit corporation in 1987 to support research and instructional capabilities of eight universities in the Washington metropolitan area. The WRLC is operated exclusively for the benefit of other non-profit institutions of higher learning by promoting the development of a cooperative network among libraries in the Washington metropolitan area and by providing services to enhance library and information resources. It included the implementation of a telecommunications network linking all eight universities and their offsite campuses to an online database of 2.6 million library records and other information databases. Paul Vassallo was the first president and CEO of the non-profit.

It is affiliated with the Consortium of Universities of the Washington Metropolitan Area. WRLC aims to do this through expanding coordination between different research libraries in the area. Major services they provide include operation of a shared online catalog, hosting an annual meeting for people involved in DC-Area research libraries, and providing environmentally controlled additional storage space for books and other media. The executive director as of 2025 was Kim Armstrong.

The combined collections of The Washington Research Library Consortium total over 22 million items, which are readily accessible. As such, the WRLC is considered essential to enabling the success of learning and scholarship.

The Consortium Loan Service (CLS) makes print materials easily available to the students, faculty and staff across the Consortium. Users may request the delivery of needed books or articles online with delivery within one or two days. In FY2024 and FY2025, over 20% of the books that have circulated have been borrowed from one of the partner universities.

== Member universities ==
Source for members

- American University
- The Catholic University of America
- Gallaudet University
- George Mason University
- The George Washington University
- Georgetown University
- Howard University (joined in 2012)
- Marymount University
- University of the District of Columbia
