= International Coalition of Library Consortia =

Library cooperative organization

International Coalition of Library Consortia (ICOLC)
- Founded: 1997; 29 years ago
- Type: Unincorporated entity
- Fields: Library consortia
- Members: 243
- Website: https://icolc.net/

The International Coalition of Library Consortia (ICOLC) is an informal, self-organized group of library consortia from around the world. Its purpose is to facilitate discussions and issue public statements about issues of common interest among library consortia, enable collaboration and collective action among consortia, and foster peer-to-peer networking and development of library best practices. Founded in 1996 and with 243 members as of 2026, ICOLC held its first meeting in 1997. ICOLC continues to hold meetings twice a year, traditionally one meeting in Europe and one in the Americas.

== Context ==
While libraries have cooperated in various ways for centuries, library consortia (cooperative associations of libraries that coordinate resources and/or activities on behalf of their members) began to form in earnest during the first half of the 20th century. Consortia coordinated collective collections, developed union catalogs, and formulated best practices. The International Federation of Library Associations (IFLA) formed in Scotland in 1927 to facilitate international library cooperation and represent the interests of the library community. In North America, the earliest consortia included the Cooperating Libraries of Upper New York (CLUNY), formed in 1931; PALINET in Pennsylvania, formed in 1936; the Triangle Research Libraries Network in North Carolina, formed in 1933; and the Center for Research Libraries (CRL), based in Illinois and formed in 1949.

During the 1960s and 1970s, consortial activity surged worldwide. OCLC began facilitating cooperative cataloging as early as 1967, followed by the Research Libraries Group (RLG) in the United States in 1974 and Australia's CAVAL consortium in 1978. During the 1980s, the rise of computers, scanners, and fax machines accelerated and expanded interlibrary loan activities. The South African Bibliographic and Information Network (SABINET) formed in 1983 to advance resource sharing among South African libraries.

A second and larger wave of consortial growth took place in the 1990s and early 2000s, driven by the rapid global shift from physical resources purchased by libraries to electronic resources that publishers and vendors licensed to libraries. Libraries responded to this digital shift by coming together to negotiate electronic resource licenses and advocate with vendors on behalf of library users. Consortia Canada formed in 1998 after discussions at an ICOLC meeting. The Canadian Research Knowledge Network (CRKN) formally incorporated in 2004 to continue the work of the Canadian National Site Licensing Project, begun in 1999. The Anatolian University Libraries Consortium (ANKOS) in Turkey formed in 2000 to advance consortial access to electronic resources. Chinese libraries founded the Shanghai Information Resources Network in 1994, while Germany's DEAL Consortium launched in 2014.

== History of ICOLC ==
Initially dubbed the Consortium of Consortia (COC), ICOLC emerged in the mid-1990s as a venue for consortia leaders worldwide "to exchange ideas and address issues of common concern." Thomas Sanville, then executive director of OhioLINK, coordinated with other consortia leaders to form the group. ICOLC was his "brainchild." In late December 1995, Sanville started an email discussion list for consortia leaders. That list initially included only six of Sanville's colleagues: Evan Reader from the California State University, Alan Charnes from the Colorado Alliance of Research Libraries, Jim Corey from the Florida Center for Library Automation (FCLA), Bill DeJohn from Minitex, Lou Parker from the University of North Carolina, and Bill Potter from GALILEO. During the early months of 1996, Sanville's email discussion list experienced rapid organic growth, and members established informal networking sessions at various library and industry conferences. By mid-1996, the group had begun planning its first dedicated in-person meeting.

ICOLC's first in-person meeting took place in February 1997 in St. Louis, Missouri. In attendance were fifty-six representatives from thirty consortia, including three Canadian consortia and one UK consortium. The first meeting outside North America took place in Cranfield, in the United Kingdom, in December 1999. By 2000, ICOLC had acquired its present name and launched a website. ICOLC soon established a cadence of two meetings annually, one in the EMEA region and one in the Americas, and began issuing statements and reports about electronic resources, usage, business models, and other issues of common interest to libraries and consortia. After Sanville retired in 2014, ICOLC members in 2015 formed a coordinating committee, which was the organization's first governing body. Coordinating committee members are elected by the ICOLC membership to guide the work of ICOLC.

By 1997, ICOLC launched a website hosted by Yale University Library and maintained by Ann Okerson. The website was later hosted by Lyrasis. Reece Steinberg from the British Columbia Electronic Library Network (BCELN) designed ICOLC's logo, which remained in use as of 2026. Since 2021, the Washington Research Library Consortium (WRLC) has hosted ICOLC's website.

== Governance ==
ICOLC is an informal, voluntary association. It is not legally incorporated in any country and does not charge membership dues. It is guided by a coordinating committee comprising nine consortia member staff who are elected by the full ICOLC membership and serve three-year terms. Coordinating committee members elect two co-chairs. The committee develops ICOLC strategy, oversees staff and operations, stewards finances, charges task forces, issues statements and reports, and convenes discussions. ICOLC maintains coordinating committee election and voting guidelines, governance structure documentation, and a code of conduct and conflict of interest policy, but it has no formal bylaws. ICOLC covers its costs through meeting registration fees and voluntary contributions from members, including staff time and indirect costs. Lyrasis serves as ICOLC's administrative agent.

== Membership ==
ICOLC membership is highly inclusive. Any library consortium worldwide, whether informal and volunteer-run or legally incorporated and well-staffed, may create an organizational profile on ICOLC's website and participate in ICOLC meetings or online discussions. ICOLC membership also reflects a wide range of consortia types, with nearly two-thirds of participating consortia serving primarily academic libraries and others serving public libraries, special libraries, government agencies, or multiple types of libraries.

ICOLC members by geographic location as of September 2026

As of August 2026, ICOLC's online global directory listed 243 participating consortia based in more than 50 countries, with US-based consortia comprising about half of these entries. Participation has expanded and diversified since the 1990s. The ICOLC website profiled 135 members in 2000, 211 in 2009, and (following a website redesign) about 170 in 2015. Of those 170 members, 59% were located in North America, 23% in Europe, 7% in Asia, 4% in the Middle East, 3% in South America, 3% in Australasia, and 1% in Africa.

As of 2015, the ICOLC email discussion list reached approximately 700 individual subscribers representing 200 consortia. As of September 2026, the ICOLC website stated that more than 800 individual subscribers were participating in the ICOLC email discussion list.

== Meetings ==
ICOLC meetings facilitate information exchange, discussion, community building, and collective action among consortia. As Grogg and Rosen observed, "much of the value of ICOLC occurs behind the scenes, as consortia informally communicate with one another to address existing and developing challenges and how they can work together to meet such challenges." ICOLC meetings are conducted under the Chatham House Rule. According to this rule, attendees at ICOLC meetings are "free to use the information received, but neither the identity nor the affiliation of the speaker(s), nor that of any other participant, may be revealed."

Early in ICOLC's history, when consortia focused primarily on eresources licensing, a key purpose of these meetings was to host "grill sessions," in which publisher and vendor representatives were invited to describe their pricing and business models and face rigorous questioning from ICOLC members. Vendors often sent senior executives to these grill sessions, recognizing the opportunity to engage with influential customers. By the 2010s, ICOLC had scaled back these grill sessions as it expanded its scope to other topics.

Since its founding, ICOLC meetings have settled into a cadence of two per year, traditionally one in Europe and one in North America, along with smaller ad hoc meetings at venues such as the American Library Association's annual conference. Since 2001, about 100 consortia representatives have attended most meetings. No vendors are permitted to sponsor meetings or attend regular sessions. Meetings take place in person, except in 2020 and 2021 when meetings went virtual due to the COVID-19 pandemic. Meeting costs are covered by attendee registration fees and in-kind contributions from member consortia that volunteered to host.

ICOLC's first meeting in 1997 featured representatives from 56 consortia, with all but four of them from the United States. By its 2001 North America meeting, meeting attendance had diversified geographically, with 20% of the attendees having come from outside the USA, from countries such as Australia, Belgium, Canada, Greece, Hungary, South Africa, Turkey, and the United Kingdom.

By 2015, ICOLC had held 26 meetings in North America and 16 in Europe. By 2026, this number had surpassed a total of 60 meetings. In September 2024, ICOLC held its first meeting outside Europe or North America: in Cape Town, South Africa.

== Statements ==
In addition to holding meetings, ICOLC publishes statements and reports on key issues relevant to libraries, seeking to make vendors more responsive to library needs and help the community to navigate issues more effectively and collaboratively. Several of the statements have received significant media attention, and they have been instrumental to guiding library work and advocacy.

The first ICOLC-issued statement was the Statement of Current Perspective and Preferred Practices for the Selection and Purchase of Electronic Information, published in March 1998. Thirteen statements along with five reports, issued between November 1998 and March 2025, were available on ICOLC's website as of September 2026. These documents tackled topics ranging from standards-based resource usage reporting to artificial intelligence in licensing to strategic interconsortial collaboration. Occasionally, ICOLC works with other organizations to issue joint statements, such as the Joint Statement on the Metadata Rights of Libraries, which ICOLC issued in 2023 in partnership with the American Library Association's Core Metadata & Collections Section.

Many ICOLC statements have been widely endorsed by individual consortia, libraries, and allied organizations. The majority of these endorsements have come from US consortia, with many other countries represented. For example, the Statement on AI in Licensing (2024) gained 89 endorsements. The Joint Statement on the Metadata Rights of Libraries (2023) garnered 56 endorsements. The Revised Statement on the Global Economic Crisis and Its Impact on Consortial Licenses (2010) had 122 endorsements.
