= Minitex =

Library organization in Minnesota, North Dakota, South Dakota

Minitex is a publicly supported information and resource sharing program for academic, government, public and specialized libraries in the states of Minnesota, North Dakota, South Dakota, and with partners in Wisconsin and Iowa. Minitex was created as a pilot project, initially funded in 1968 through a grant from the Louis and Maude Hill Foundation and state and federal grant funds from the Minnesota State Department of Education.

Today the system is a joint effort of the Minnesota Office of Higher Education and the University of Minnesota Libraries. Minitex is funded by the Minnesota State Legislature to serve higher education communities, and it also provides services for public, school, and specialized libraries in Minnesota through contracts with the Minnesota Department of Education.

The purpose of Minitex is to enhance library effectiveness by expanding information resources for libraries and providing services to their patrons. Minitex offers access to training, workshops, conferences, and events for the library and education community.

== Minitex services ==
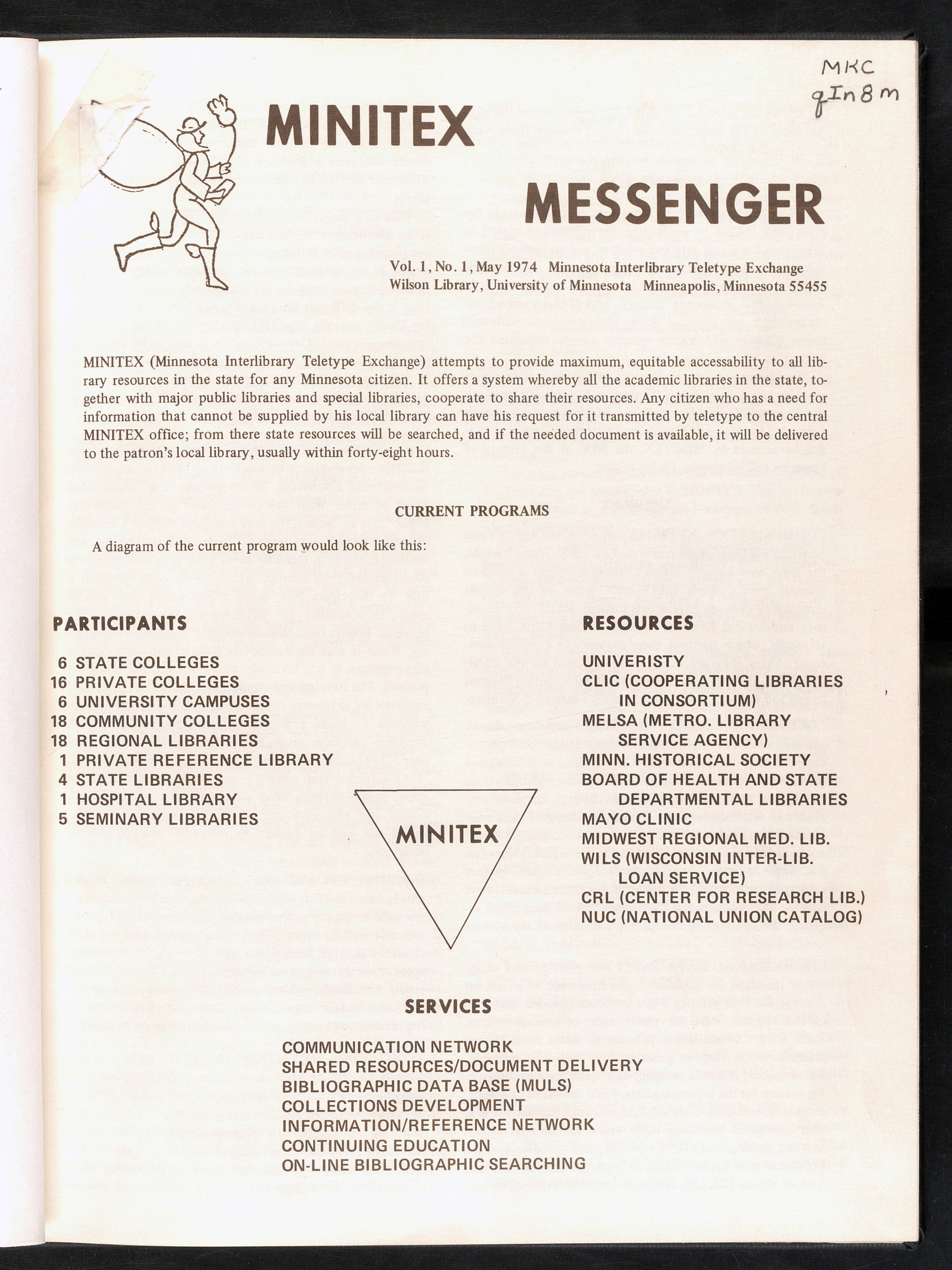
Minitex Messenger, Volume 1, Number 1, May 1974, with diagram of early Minitex services and programs

Libraries and their patrons can access a number of different services and information resources. These components include the MNLINK, ELM, Minnesota Digital Library, Ebooks Minnesota, AskMN, and the Minnesota Library Access Center.

The MNLINK interlibrary loan system enables users to request materials from one of 600 participating Minnesota libraries to be shared. The Electronic Library for Minnesota is a collection of statewide research and information databases available to the public. Ebooks Minnesota provides a publicly available collection of ebooks. In addition, the Minitex system links library loans from the University of Minnesota Libraries collection, other participating libraries, and other resource sharing services.

Other programs managed by Minitex include the Minnesota Digital Library, a digital library of Minnesota-specific primary and secondary sources from cultural heritage organizations across the state, and the Minnesota Library Access Center, a storage facility for collections from 21 libraries.
