= DEAL Consortium =

German open access academic publishing consortium

Project DEAL (Projekt DEAL) is a consortium-like structure spearheaded by the German Rectors' Conference, on behalf of its fellow members in the Alliance of Science Organizations in Germany and tasked with negotiating nationwide transformative open access agreements with the three largest commercial publishers of scholarly journals (Elsevier, Springer Nature, and Wiley) for the benefit of all German academic institutions, including universities, research institutes, and their libraries. Through each of these agreements, the consortium aims to secure immediate open access publication of all new research articles by authors from German institutions, permanent full-text access to the publisher's complete journal portfolio, and fair pricing for these services according to a simple cost model based on the number of articles published.

Project DEAL is part of a much larger movement worldwide that led to boycotts of mega publishers like Elsevier to achieve publishing and access deals that cover all universities at once within a defined space (usually a country, consortium or university system) rather than single universities. These boycotts have led to significant reductions in profits and pushed mega publishers to reduce their prices and make several other concessions.

Project DEAL has changed its name to the DEAL Consortium.

== Publish and read model ==
The publish and read (PAR) cost model introduced with Projekt DEAL's transformative agreements replaces the lump-sum payments of subscriptions with per-article fees and brings hybrid open access publishing fees into check under a central agreement administered by institutions. The per-article PAR fee differs from the article processing charge (the standard article fee in gold open access journals) because it simultaneously covers the publication of a single article and the institutional costs for unrestricted reading access to the journals covered in the agreement.

== Negotiations with companies ==
=== With Elsevier ===
Negotiations between Projekt DEAL and Elsevier started in 2016. No agreement could be reached on a new model under the terms of Projekt DEAL, and the negotiations were officially called off in July 2018. In support of Projekt DEAL's mandate to negotiate centrally, ca. 200 German Universities did not renew their expiring individual contracts with Elsevier starting January 2017. Dozens of German researchers resigned from their editor roles for Elsevier journals to strengthen Projekt DEAL's push for open access. In 2023, Elsevier and The Deal Consortium reached an agreement, ending the boycott at least until 2028.

=== With Wiley ===
On 15 January 2019, Projekt DEAL signed a 3-year contract with Wiley according to which researchers at more than 700 German academic institutions are able to access content from Wiley journals back to 1997 and to publish open access in all of the publisher's hybrid and gold open access journal portfolio (ca. 1,500 journals). The costs of the agreement are based on the number of articles published, with the per-article PAR fee set at €2,750 for publications in hybrid journals. A 20% discount applies to the article processing charges for publications in gold open access journals.

=== With Springer Nature ===
On August 22, 2019, Projekt DEAL signed a Memorandum of Understanding with Springer Nature which was followed by a 3-year contract starting 1 January 2020. This second agreement negotiated by Projekt DEAL is regarded as the world's largest transformative open access agreement at the time of signing. With more than 13,000 scholarly articles by authors affiliated with German institutions accepted for publication each year in Springer Nature journals, the publisher disseminates a significant portion of Germany's research output. The agreement enables open access publishing of articles in approximately 2,500 Springer Nature journals and offers participating institutions extensive access to the publisher's journal portfolio.

== Criticism ==
Criticism of Projekt DEAL points to the fact that it focuses on the largest publishers only and that it would therefore encourage authors to publish open access exclusively with the two largest publishers with which there are agreements in place. Under this assumption, Projekt DEAL would therefore put smaller and emerging fully open access publishers at a competitive disadvantage, and would have the potential to harm the long tail of fully (gold) open access publishers, undermining fair competition between publishers. As commented by OASPA:

[...]Many are not even of sufficient size to make agreements directly with institutions. For a healthy, competitive market in the longer term, the needs of fully open access publishers must not be overlooked at this critical stage. Smaller publishers, learned societies and innovative new platforms will be at a significant disadvantage unless they are properly considered and steps are taken to ensure they are able to compete fairly in the market. Conducting discussions with smaller publishers, both fully OA and those with mixed models, and sharing the outcomes and ideas that arise could therefore be enormously helpful.

Proponents of transformative agreements such as those signed by Projekt DEAL disagree with this view, highlighting the fact many national consortia have reached central agreements with open access publishers:

[...]Virtually all of the institutions with agreements logged in the ESAC Transformative Agreement Registry have entered into central agreements with open access publishers—some as early as well over a decade ago—fully subsidizing their authors, through a variety of OA business models, to publish in their journal portfolios(…). These central agreements reflect institutional and library policies that prioritize openness and, in the case of financial strain, protect funds supporting open access over closed venues.

== See also ==
- Plan S
- Open access in Germany
