= Library consortium =

Cooperative association of libraries

A library consortium is any cooperative association of libraries that coordinates resources and/or activities on behalf of its members, whether they are academic, public, school or special libraries, and/or information centers. Library consortia have been created to service specific regions or geographic areas, e.g., local, state, regional, national or international. Many libraries commonly belong to multiple consortia. The goal of a library consortium is to amplify the capabilities and effectiveness of its member libraries through collective action, including, but not limited to, print or electronic resource sharing, reducing costs through group purchases of resources, and hosting professional development opportunities. The "bedrock principle upon which consortia operate is that libraries can accomplish more together than alone."

== Types of library consortia ==
"Library consortia are as varied as the libraries they serve" and can vary in almost all aspects, including scope, organizational structure, membership size, and mission. Broadly, library consortia can be classified using three categories: geographic region, membership participation, and governance framework.

=== Geographic regions ===
Library consortia have been operating globally for decades, with a majority of consortia located in the United States and Europe. Library consortia are also established in Canada, Asia, United Kingdom, South America, Middle East, Australia, Africa, and New Zealand. Geographically, consortia can represent state, regional, national, or international interests.

North America, including the United States and Canada, accounts for nearly 60% of consortia registered with the International Coalition of Library Consortia (ICOLC). North American consortia typically exist at the local, state/provincial, and regional level. While some consortia exist at the national level, groups are often initially formed to address concerns within a network of geographically associated libraries.

In Europe and other regions of the world, consortia usually represent libraries at the national level. For example, Couperin negotiates for electronic resources on behalf of academic library organizations in France. Japan’s Alliance of University Library Consortia for E-Resources (JUSTICE) provides similar services for libraries in Japan.

Internationally, multi-country consortia represent libraries cooperating across the globe to develop specific services, such as technology-driven AMICAL, or to pool resources for specialized organization types, such as international law library consortium NELLCO.

=== Membership participation ===
Participation in a library consortium can differ by library type and library activity, and, in some instances, level of membership. Membership is not always restricted, and libraries can belong to one or more consortia.

A consortium can represent the interests of a single type of library, which include academic libraries, special libraries, and public libraries, while a multi-type consortium represents multiple library types and often serves all libraries in a central region.

A consortium may also serve specific library interests or activities, such as electronic resource licensing or resource sharing.

=== Governance frameworks ===
Library consortia can be established informally or formally, with few or many staff, and with widely differing procedures, funding models, and strategic mandates. The most prevalent governance frameworks can be classified by the underlying funding model of the consortium, which commonly include:

- Membership fees
- Government or public sponsorship
- Administrative surcharges
- Private funding

== Types of consortial work ==
Library consortia perform a variety of functions, typically focused on a few key activities, intended to serve their members and the wider community.

=== Licensing and content negotiation ===
The most traditional function of a library consortium is content negotiation. As publishers increasingly offer digital packages of content, such as scholarly databases, ebooks, electronic journals, streaming video, and other digital content, library consortia provide negotiation power to ensure better licensing agreements for their members. When negotiating with publishers, consortia staff focus both on obtaining a better price for their content and better licensing terms that are agreeable to the libraries. Libraries choose to work through consortia because they receive more resources for their money while expending less staff time in vendor negotiations. Publishers are incentivized to work with consortia because they receive more guaranteed income from increased participation.

In recent years, a major focus of consortial content negotiation is Open Access (OA). Many national consortia set and/or enforce national mandates for open scholarship, which dictate what types of scholarship must be published as OA. This is often done through licensing negotiations with major publishers. For example, the Danish National Library Authority’s licensing negotiations "include price, conditions of use, open access in accordance with the support of the National Strategy For Open Access."

Many of the agreements consortia make on behalf of institutions and researchers are called "transformative agreements," meaning that they are transforming formerly paywalled content into open content. In the U.S., for example, the California Digital Library negotiated a deal with scientific publisher Elsevier in 2021 to ensure that all research produced by scholars working in the University of California system would be published as OA over a four-year period.

=== Shared technology infrastructure ===
A shared technological infrastructure is a newer, but no less important, function of library consortia. For some consortia, this means centralized hosting of shared information systems. For example, consortia often host integrated library systems on behalf of networks of libraries, so that no single institution is responsible for the technical demands of the software. Other consortia host centralized repositories of digital materials, which could be themed around geographic regions (such as the Kentucky Digital Library devoted to digital archives from the Commonwealth of Kentucky) or subject matter (such as the Inter-university Consortium for Political and Social Research, a self-publishing repository for social, behavioral, and health sciences research data).

Some consortia are hubs for software development, working with their library constituents to identify technological gaps in their institutions. These projects are often community-led and/or open source. For example, Jisc, based in the UK, developed IRUS, an Institutional Repository Usage Statistics software service, which calculates standards-based usage statistics for institutional repositories of university publishing. In an example of cross-consortial work in the U.S., the Pennsylvania Academic Library Consortium (PALCI) partnered with the Private Academic Library Network of Indiana (PALNI) to develop and pilot an open-source, multi-tenant institutional repository specifically for consortia (Hyku for Consortia).

Other shared technology infrastructure initiatives might include open source software hosting, joint digitization services, and digital content accessibility testing.

=== Professional development ===
Increasingly, library consortia provide professional development opportunities for their member libraries. Different consortia provide paid or free opportunities for librarians to learn new skills, introduce new technologies, and learn about trends in the field. Many consortia internally develop in person or online programming and often host their own regular meetings and/or conferences to encourage networking and skill sharing among their members. The Professional Development Alliance is an effort to share professional development content amongst consortia.

=== Shared print programs ===
Library consortia help coordinate shared print programs, allowing institutions within certain geographic regions to maintain a practical number of copies of scholarly monographs. These programs "protect against the loss of resources as pressure grows to reduce and repurpose space in library buildings." Shared print programs can be regional or national in scale.

Library consortia often cover many different activities not mentioned above, including, but not limited to consulting services, grant funding, and industry research.

== History in the United States ==
Library cooperation in the United States has been documented as early as 1867 with the American Library Association (ALA)’s Committee on Cooperation in Indexing and Cataloguing College Libraries. Despite the early cooperative activity, the earliest example of a formally established consortium would not arise until 1933 with the Triangle Research Libraries Network (TRLN), which was founded to serve the major academic libraries of North Carolina.

The 1960s and 1970s are considered the "heyday of consortia development," with many consortia established during this time period. However, several significant developments in the United States between the late 1940s to the mid-1990s marked the current evolution of library consortia.

An early form of "shared print," now a widespread consortial activity, began in 1949 when the Center for Research Libraries (CRL) was founded as a consortium of ten major research libraries "to conduct and maintain a place or places for the deposit, storage, care, delivery and exchange of books ... and other articles containing written, printed, or recorded matter."

In 1967, OCLC was formed for the purposes of shared library cataloging. As a focus of library activity, shared cataloging was accompanied by the spread of online catalog systems, and many new statewide and regional consortia coalesced around shared online catalog systems, particularly in the 1970s and continuing through the 1990s. Some of these consortia were associated with OCLC as "OCLC networks," and these consortia often crossed state lines to cover broad regions of the United States.

By the mid-1990s, a new consortial activity rose to prominence: the collaborative licensing of electronic resources. Consortial licensing became a primary activity for many consortia as libraries transitioned from print-focused collection development to providing access to a growing number of online indices, databases, and encyclopedias. The market of consortial licensing has continued unabated to the present, as content providers provide new content or new services, such as research support and publishing metrics.

== See also ==
- International Coalition of Library Consortia (ICOLC)
- List of library associations
- List of library consortia
- Project DEAL
