= List of academic publishers by preprint policy =

This is a list of publishers of academic journals by their submission policies regarding the use of preprints prior to publication (example list).

Publishers' policies on self-archiving (including of preprint versions) can also be found at SHERPA/RoMEO.

== Policies by publisher ==
Submission of preprints is accepted by all open access journals. Over the last decade, they have been joined by most subscription journals, however publisher policies are often vague or ill-defined.

In general, most publishers that permit preprints require that:

- the authors disclose the existence of the preprint at submission (e.g. in the cover letter)
- once an article is published, the preprint should link to the published version (typically via DOI)
- the preprint should not have been formally peer reviewed

Publishers may place additional restrictions (e.g. specifying non-commercial servers or preferred licenses). Most publishers have a unified policy across all of their journals, however some journals list exceptions in their own policies.

Publisher	Restrictions			Source
Publisher	Location	Version	License	Source
American Association for the Advancement of Science	Not-for-profit servers (e.g. arXiv, bioRxiv, chemRxiv, medRxiv)	Unrestricted	Unrestricted	
American Association for Cancer Research	Unrestricted	Must not post revised manuscript (after peer review or editorial comment)	Unrestricted	
American Association for Physics in Medicine	Non-commercial servers (e.g. arXiv, Open Science Framework, Zenodo)	Unrestricted	Unrestricted	
American Chemical Society	Unrestricted	Unrestricted	Unrestricted	
Association for Computing Machinery	Non-commercial servers (e.g. arXiv, Open Science Framework, Zenodo)	Unrestricted	Unrestricted	
American Geophysical Union	Unrestricted	Unrestricted	Unrestricted	
American Heart Association	Unrestricted	Versions of a manuscript that have been altered as a result of the peer review process may not be deposited	Unrestricted	
American Institute of Physics (AIP Publishing)	Unrestricted	Unrestricted	Unrestricted	
American Institute of Aeronautics and Astronautics	Unrestricted	Unrestricted	Unrestricted	
American Physical Society	Unrestricted	Unrestricted	Unrestricted	
American Physiological Society	Unrestricted	Unrestricted	Unrestricted	
American Phytopathological Society	Unrestricted	Unrestricted	Unrestricted	
American Psychiatric Association Publishing	Unrestricted	Submitted manuscript must add meaningful new information above that already in the preprint	Unrestricted	
American Society of Agronomy	Unrestricted	Unrestricted	Unrestricted	
American Society for Biochemistry and Molecular Biology	Not-for-profit servers (e.g. arXiv, bioRxiv, chemRxiv, medRxiv)	Unrestricted	Must assign publisher copyright or pay Article Processing Charge for hybrid OA publication.	
American Society for Cell Biology	Unrestricted	Unrestricted	Unrestricted	
American Society for Clinical Investigation	Unrestricted	Unrestricted	Unrestricted	
American Society of Clinical Oncology	Unrestricted	Unrestricted	Unrestricted	
American Society for Microbiology	Unrestricted	Unrestricted	Must assign publisher copyright or pay Article Processing Charge for hybrid OA publication.	
American Society of Plant Biologists	Unrestricted	Unrestricted	Unrestricted	
American Statistical Association	Unrestricted	Unrestricted	Unrestricted	
American Thoracic Society	Unrestricted	Versions of a manuscript that have been altered as a result of the peer review process may not be deposited	Unrestricted	
Beilstein-Institut	Non-commercial servers (e.g. arXiv, Open Science Framework, Zenodo) or the author's university repository	Unrestricted	Unrestricted	
British Editorial Society of Bone & Joint Surgery	Does not accept clinical research articles that have been shared as preprints.	Does not accept clinical research articles that have been shared as preprints.	Does not accept clinical research articles that have been shared as preprints.	
British Medical Journal Company	Not-for-profit servers (e.g. arXiv, bioRxiv, chemRxiv, medRxiv)	Unrestricted	Unrestricted	
Canadian Science Publishing	Unrestricted	Unrestricted	Unrestricted	
Cambridge University Press	Unrestricted	Unrestricted	Unrestricted	
Cold Spring Harbor Laboratory Press	Unrestricted	Unrestricted	Unrestricted	
Commonwealth Scientific and Industrial Research Organisation Publishing	Unrestricted	Pre-publication version only	Unrestricted	
The Company of Biologists	Unrestricted	Unrestricted	Unrestricted	
Crop Science Society of America	Unrestricted	Unrestricted	Unrestricted	
De Gruyter	Unrestricted	Unrestricted	Unrestricted	
eLife Sciences Publications Ltd	Unrestricted	Unrestricted	Unrestricted	
Elsevier	Unrestricted, except: Biophysical Journal also includes that: preprint posting is only permitted to a private website, arXiv, bioRxiv, chemRxiv, or GitHub.	Unrestricted, except: Cell Press journals also include: Versions of a manuscript that have altered as a result of the peer review process may not be deposited.	Unrestricted	
Emerald Group Publishing	Unrestricted	Unrestricted	Unrestricted	
European Molecular Biology Organization Press	Unrestricted	No updated versions may be posted to preprint servers after initial submission to the journal.	Unrestricted	
European Respiratory Society	Unrestricted	Versions of a manuscript that have been altered as a result of the peer review process may not be deposited	Unrestricted	
Faculty of 1000	Unrestricted	Unrestricted	Unrestricted	
Federation of American Societies for Experimental Biology	Unrestricted	Unrestricted	If posted under any open access license, must pay Article Processing Charge for hybrid OA publication.	
Frontiers Media	Unrestricted	Unrestricted	Unrestricted	
Genetics Society of America	Unrestricted	Unrestricted	Unrestricted	
Institute of Physics Publishing Publishing	Unrestricted	Unrestricted	Unrestricted	
IOS Press	Unrestricted	Unrestricted	Unrestricted	
Institute of Electrical and Electronics Engineers	Unrestricted	Unrestricted	Unrestricted	
IUCr Journals	Unrestricted	Unrestricted	Unrestricted	
Japan Society for Cell Biology	Unrestricted	Versions of a manuscript that have been altered as a result of the peer review process may not be deposited	Unrestricted	
The JAMA Network	Unrestricted	Submitted manuscript must add meaningful new information above that already in the preprint	Unrestricted	
JMIR Publications	Unrestricted	Unrestricted	Unrestricted	
The Journal of Bone and Joint Surgery Inc.	Does not accept clinical research articles that have been shared as preprints.	Does not accept clinical research articles that have been shared as preprints.	Does not accept clinical research articles that have been shared as preprints.	
Mary Ann Liebert, Inc.	Unrestricted	Unrestricted	Unrestricted	
Massachusetts Medical Society	nonprofit preprint server	Unrestricted	Unrestricted	
Microbiology Society	Unrestricted	Unrestricted	Unrestricted	
MyJove Corp.	Not-for-profit servers (e.g. arXiv, bioRxiv, chemRxiv, medRxiv)	Unrestricted	When posting the preprint, authors should choose a CC BY-NC-ND license	
National Academy of Sciences	Unrestricted	Unrestricted	Unrestricted	
Optica	Unrestricted	Unrestricted	Unrestricted	
Oxford University Press	Unrestricted, except: Nucleic Acids Research specifically prohibits Nature Precedings or PLOS Currents (though both are no longer operative since 2018).	Unrestricted	Unrestricted, except: American Society for Nutrition journals require that if posted under any open access license, author must pay Article Processing Charge for hybrid OA publication.	
PeerJ	Unrestricted	Unrestricted	Unrestricted	
Public Library of Science	Unrestricted	Unrestricted	Unrestricted	
Rockefeller University Press	Unrestricted	Unrestricted	Unrestricted	
Royal Society Publishing	Unrestricted	Unrestricted	Unrestricted	
SAGE Publishing	Unrestricted, except: The following journals opt out of SAGE's publication policies: Acta Radiologica does not accept preprint submissions. Sports Health does not accept preprint submissions. Political Insight 'may accept' preprint submissions. California Management Review, Index on Censorship, Recherche et Applications en Marketing and Pain News, do not include a statement on either prior publication or preprints.	Unrestricted	Unrestricted	
Society for Judgment and Decision Making	Unrestricted	Unrestricted	Unrestricted	
Society for Neuroscience	Unrestricted	Unrestricted	Unrestricted	
Soil Science Society of America	Unrestricted	Unrestricted	Unrestricted	
SPIE	Unrestricted	Pre-publication version only	Unrestricted	
Springer Nature	Unrestricted	Unrestricted	Unrestricted	
Taylor & Francis	Unrestricted	Unrestricted	Unrestricted	
University of Chicago Press	Non-commercial servers (e.g. arXiv, Open Science Framework, Zenodo) Except: The American Naturalist also prohibits repositories with publications attached (e.g. PeerJ)	Unrestricted	License must be CC BY-NC. If CC BY, must pay Article Processing Charge for hybrid OA publication.	
WikiJournal User Group	Unrestricted	Unrestricted	Unrestricted	
Wiley	Unrestricted, except: Journal of Orthopaedic Research does not accept clinical research articles that have been shared as preprints.	Unrestricted, except: Journal of Orthopaedic Research does not accept clinical research articles that have been shared as preprints.	Unrestricted, except: Journal of Orthopaedic Research does not accept clinical research articles that have been shared as preprints.	
Wolters Kluwer	Unrestricted, except: Clinical Orthopaedics and Related Research Does not accept clinical research articles that have been shared as preprints.	Unrestricted, except: Clinical Orthopaedics and Related Research Does not accept clinical research articles that have been shared as preprints.	Unrestricted, except: Clinical Orthopaedics and Related Research Does not accept clinical research articles that have been shared as preprints.	
World Scientific	Unrestricted	Unrestricted	Unrestricted	

== See also ==
- Copyright policies of academic publishers
- Ingelfinger rule
- List of open-access journals
- List of preprint repositories
- List of research funders by preprint licensing policy
