= MedRxiv =

Preprint service

medrXiv
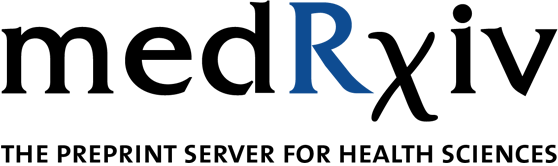
- Website type: Distribution of medical research preprints
- Available in: English
- Owner: openRxiv
- Website: medrxiv.org
- Commercial: No
- Launched: June 2019; 7 years ago
- Current status: Online

medRxiv (pronounced "med-archive") is an online disciplinary repository publishing preprints in all disciplines of the health sciences. It distributes papers in the areas of medicine and clinical research without charge to the reader.

In January 2022, there were over 10,000 papers released on medRxiv, which is a 50% increase compared to January 2020. As of December 2024, medRxiv contains more than 61,000 papers.

The site was founded in 2019 by John Inglis and Richard Sever of Cold Spring Harbor Laboratory (CSHL), Theodora Bloom and Claire Rawlinson of BMJ (the medical publisher), and Joseph Ross and Harlan Krumholz of Yale University. The server was owned and operated by CSHL until March 11, 2025, when ownership transferred to the newly formed non-profit openRxiv, dedicated to bioRxiv and medRxiv.

medRxiv, and its sister site, bioRxiv, have been major sources for the dissemination of research on COVID-19.

medRxiv is indexed by Crossref, Google Scholar, Semantic Scholar, Europe PubMed Central and Web of Science's Preprint Citation Index. In addition preprints reporting research funded by the National Institutes of Health are indexed by PubMed.

== See also ==
- ArXiv
- BioRxiv
- ChemRxiv
- PsyArXiv
- List of academic databases and search engines
- List of academic journals by preprint policy
- List of preprint repositories
- Sci-Hub
- ViXra
