= EarthArXiv =

Preprint server and scholar community

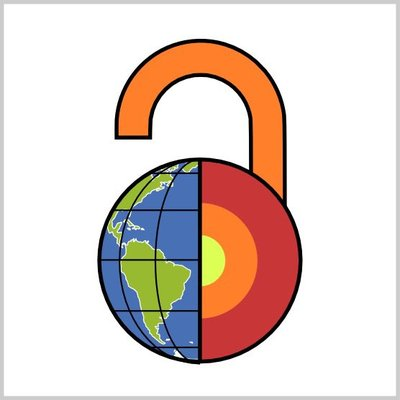
- Website type: Science
- Available in: English
- Website: eartharxiv.org
- Commercial: No
- Launched: October 23, 2017
- Current status: Online
- Content license: Creative Commons

EarthArXiv (pronounced "Earth archive") is both a preprint server and a volunteer community devoted to open scholarly communication. As a preprint server, EarthArXiv publishes articles from all subdomains of Earth Science and related domains of planetary science. These publications are versions of scholarly papers that precede publication in peer-reviewed scientific journals. EarthArXiv is not itself a journal and does not evaluate the scientific quality of a paper. Instead, EarthArXiv serves as a platform for free hosting and rapid dissemination of scientific results. The EarthArXiv platform assigns each submission a Digital Object Identifier (DOI), therefore assigning provenance and making it citable in other scholarly works. EarthArXiv's mission is to promote open access, share open access and preprint resources, and participate in shared governance of the preprint server and its policies. EarthArXiv was launched on October 23, 2017.

== History ==
The idea of an Earth Science-focused preprint service developed independently in the U.K and the U.S. in early-2017. Christopher Jackson, inspired by ArXiv, and preprints subsequent expansion into other fields (e.g. BioRxiv, ChemRxiv), began gathering European support for an Earth science preprint service. Jackson inquired with the Center for Open Science (COS), a U.S.-based non-profit about using their existing preprint infrastructure, which is based on the Open Science Framework (OSF), to host the service. COS was hosting (at the time) 20 domain specific preprint systems and was interested in expanding into the Earth sciences. COS would provide the technical infrastructure – storage space, DOI generation, web hosting, etc. - with a community of international Earth scientist volunteers providing shared governance.

Around the same time, Bruce Caron and Tom Narock, having seen a COS demonstration at a meeting of the Earth Science Information Partners (ESIP), also began discussing an Earth science themed preprint system with U.S. colleagues. COS put Caron and Narock in touch with Jackson in spring-2017, and a concerted effort was made to get the newly named EarthArXiv off the ground. The EarthArXiv principles resonated with ESIP, and they became a collaborating partner. ESIP supplied physical meeting space as well as multiple means of virtual communication to accelerate the effort. On June 1, 2017 the ESIP support coalesced into a formal working group, the Earth Sciences Pre-Print Cluster. The cluster held bi-weekly conference calls and hosted their first in-person meeting during a break-out session of the Summer 2017 ESIP Meeting in Bloomington, Indiana.

The group spent six months community building, exploring other platforms (such as PLOS and PeerJ), and soliciting community feedback on how EarthArXiv should be constructed, and how it should operate. During this time, over 100 international volunteers came forward offering to promote and help run EarthArXiv. A final decision was made to partner with COS and on October 23, 2017 – the first day of Open Access Week 2017 – EarthArXiv began accepting preprints. ESIP continues to support EarthArXiv; however, the Earth Sciences Pre-Print Cluster was disbanded and governance now maintained by the EarthArXiv Advisory Council. On October 1, 2020, EarthArXiv moved its hosting to the California Digital Library, and the Janeway publication platform.

== Disciplines ==
EarthArXiv publishes pre- and postprints from all subdomains of Earth science and related domains of planetary science including geochemistry.

== See also ==
- List of preprint repositories
