= Article (publishing) =

Published written work

An article or piece is a written work published in a print or electronic medium for the propagation of information, such as news, research results, academic analysis or debate. Articles are published on paper and digitally.

== News ==
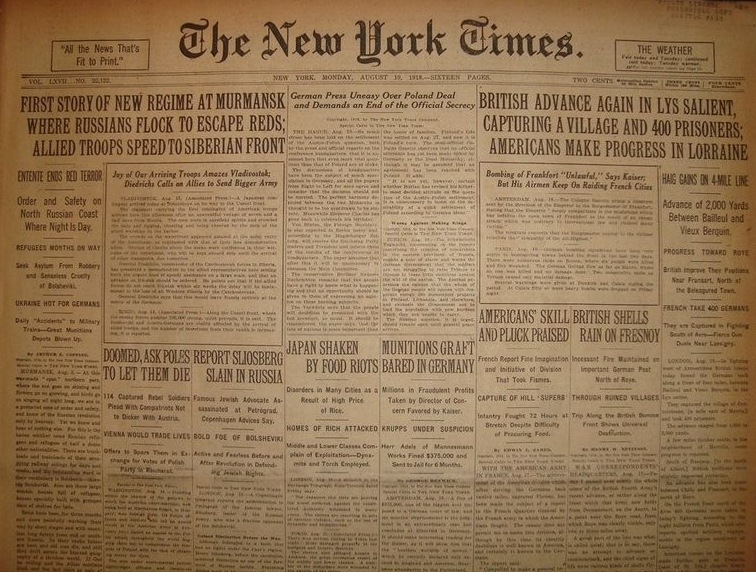
The front page of The New York Times for August 19, 1918

A news article discusses current or recent news of either general interest (i.e. daily newspapers) or of a specific topic (i.e. political or trade news magazines, club newsletters or technology news websites).

A news article can include accounts of eyewitnesses to the happening event. It can contain photographs, accounts, statistics, graphs, recollections, interviews, polls, debates on the topic, etc. Headlines can be used to focus the reader's attention on a particular (or main) part of the article. The writer can also give facts and detailed information following answers to general questions like who, what, when, where, why and how.

Quoted references can also be helpful. References to people can also be made through the written accounts of interviews and debates confirming the factuality of the writer's information and the reliability of his source. The writer can use redirection to ensure that the reader keeps reading the article and to draw her attention to other articles. For example, phrases like "Continued on page 3" redirect the reader to a page where the article is continued.

While a good conclusion is an important ingredient for newspaper articles, the immediacy of a deadline environment means that copy editing occasionally takes the form of deleting everything past an arbitrary point in the story corresponding to the dictates of available space on a page. Therefore, newspaper reporters are trained to write in inverted pyramid style, with all the most important information in the first paragraph or two. If the less vital details are pushed toward the end of the story, then the potentially destructive impact of draconian copy editing will be minimized.

Types of news articles include:

- Breaking news, a quick, tentative update about an event that is happening right now
- News reports, e.g., a local news report about plans for a new school, or a world news report about a natural disaster
- Feature article, longer, more creatively written articles that include both human-interest stories and news articles
- Investigative reports and enterprise news reports, based on the journalist's decision to investigate a subject that has not been publicized
- Lead-alls, a central article that provides an overview of major news events and connects to related articles on narrower subjects;
- Columns, a recurring item
- Opinion pieces, including editorials (written by the editors of the publication) and op-eds (written by people outside the news organization)

== Scholarly ==
In academic publishing, a paper is an academic work that is usually published in an academic journal. It contains original research results or reviews existing results. Such a paper, also called an article, will only be considered valid if it undergoes a process of peer review by one or more referees (who are academics in the same field) who check that the content of the paper is suitable for publication in the journal. A paper may undergo a series of reviews, revisions, and re-submissions before finally being accepted or rejected for publication. This process typically takes several months. Next, there is often a delay of many months (or in some fields, over a year) before an accepted manuscript appears. This is particularly true for the most popular journals where the number of accepted articles often outnumbers the space for printing. Due to this, many academics self-archive a 'preprint' or 'postprint' copy of their paper for free download from their personal or institutional website.

== Electronic ==
Electronic articles are articles in scholarly journals or magazines that can be accessed via electronic transmission. They are a specialized form of electronic document, with a specialized content, purpose, format, metadata and availability – they consist of individual articles from scholarly journals or magazines (and now sometimes popular magazines), they have the purpose of providing material for academic research and study, they are formatted approximately like printed journal articles, the metadata is entered into specialized databases, such as the Directory of Open Access Journals as well as the databases for the discipline, and they are predominantly available through academic libraries and special libraries, generally at a fixed charge.

Electronic articles can be found in online-only journals (par excellence), but in the 21st century they have also become common as online versions of articles that also appear in printed journals. The practice of publishing of an electronic version of an article before it later appears in print is sometimes called epub ahead of print (particularly in PubMed), ahead of print (AOP), article in press or article-in-press (AIP), or advanced online publication (AOP) (for example, in the context of CrossRef).

The version of record (VoR) represents the definitive form of the article. Electronic VoRs remain largely stable, although a few types of changes may be made: most importantly, errors in the VoR, whose corrections are announced by errata or corrigenda, are often corrected within an electronic VoR itself, so that readers of the VoR will not be unnecessarily confused or misled, and the VoR then makes reference to the erratum or corrigendum for clarity's sake. The other class of changes is that if an author in the byline has had a legal name change since the VoR was published, the byline of the electronic VoR may be updated to show their current name, depending on each publisher's stated policy.

The term electronic articles can also be used for the electronic versions of less formal publications, such as online archives, working paper archives from universities, government agencies, private and public think tanks and institutes and private websites. In many academic areas, specialized bibliographic databases are available to find their online content.

Most commercial sites are subscription-based or sell pay-per-view access. Many universities subscribe to electronic journals to provide access to their students and faculty, sometimes other people. An increasing number of journals are now available with open access, requiring no subscription. Most working paper archives and articles on personal homepages are free, as are collections in institutional repositories and subject repositories.

The most common formats of transmission are HTML, PDF and, in specialized fields like mathematics and physics, TeX and PostScript.

== See also ==
- Academic publishing
- Article directory
- Electronic article
- Electronic journal
- Eprint
  - Preprint
  - Postprint
- Scholarly article
- Scientific article
