= List of preprint repositories =

This is a list of repositories used to store open science research outputs, which may include preprints, datasets, and journal publications with open content licenses.

== List ==
Name	Discipline(s) (Note: The Discipline(s) contain only the repository's main focus, as in virtually all preprint servers there are manuscripts from many subjects.)	Description	Size (Note: Some servers will continue to host the preprint even once a published version is available. Others will 'convert' preprints to published articles (where the DOI of the published article is a version the preprint's doi). Sizes of the different repositories are therefore often not comparable.)	Created (Note: If Created is red, it means that the preprint server is no longer operating.)	Provider(s)
AIJR Preprints	Multidisciplinary	AIJR Preprints is an open-access Indian preprint repository which is indexed in Europe PMC and listed in OpenDOAR	>100	2020	AIJR Publisher
AAS Open Research	Multidisciplinary	At least one of the authors must be affiliated with the African Academy of Sciences	>100	2018	African Academy of Sciences & F1000 Research Ltd
AMRC Open Research	Medicine	At least one of the authors must be affiliated with AMRC member charities	<100	2019	Association of Medical Research Charities & F1000 Research Ltd
agriRxiv	Agriculture	Global preprint service for agriculture and allied sciences	>100	2017	Open Access India & CAB International
APSA Preprints	Political science	Early research outputs in political science and related disciplines	>100	2019	American Political Science Association & Cambridge University Press
mp_arc	Mathematical physics	Main focus: mathematics, physics	>10,000	1991–2023	University of Texas at Austin, Università Roma Tre, Universitat de Barcelona
arXiv	Multidisciplinary	Main focus: mathematics, physics, astronomy, computer science, quantitative biology, statistics, quantitative finance and economics	>1,000,000	1991	Cornell University
AfricArXiv	Multidisciplinary	Preprint server for interdisciplinary research in Africa	>100	2018	Center for Open Science
Arabixiv	Multidisciplinary	Arabic Preprint Server	>100	2018	Center for Open Science
ARPHA Preprints	Multidisciplinary	The submission systems limited to the participating ARPHA journals	<100	2020	Pensoft Publishers
Authorea	Multidisciplinary	A collaborative writing platform that can be used as preprint server	>10,000	2013	Atypon
Beilstein Archives	Multidisciplinary	Preprint server for Beilstein journals	>100	2019	Beilstein Institut
BioHackrXiv	Life Sciences	Preprint server to report on works done during BioHackathons, CodeFests, Sprints or similar events	>170	2020	Center for Open Science
bioRxiv	Biology	Open access preprint repository for the biological sciences	>100,000	2013	Cold Spring Harbor Laboratory
BodoArXiv	Medieval Studies	Open Repository for Medieval Studies	<100	2019	ScholarlyHub & Center for Open Science
Cell Sneak Peek	Biology	Manuscript under review in Cell Press journals	>1,000	2018	Elsevier
ChemRxiv	Chemistry	Open access preprint archive for chemistry	>10,000	2017	American Chemical Society, Royal Society of Chemistry & German Chemical Society
ChinaXiv	Multidisciplinary	Preprint server for interdisciplinary research in China	>10,000	2016	National Science Library, Chinese Academy of Sciences
CogPrints	Multidisciplinary	Psychology, Neuroscience, Linguistics, Computer Science, Philosophy, and Biology	>1,000	1997–2017	University of Southampton
CrimRxiv	Criminology	Criminology's open archive	>100	2020	University of Manchester
Cryptology ePrint Archive	Cryptography	Open access preprint archive for cryptography	>1,000	1996	International Association for Cryptologic Research
EarthArXiv	Earth science	All subdomains of Earth Science and related domains of planetary science	>1,000	2017	California Digital Library
EcoEvoRxiv	Ecology	A free preprint service for ecology, evolution and conservation	>100	2018	Center for Open Science
EconStor	Economics and Business Studies	A subject based repository with a high share of working papers (preprints)	>100,000	2009	ZBW - Leibniz Information Centre for Economics
ECSarXiv	Electrochemistry	A free preprint service for electrochemistry and solid state science and technology	>100	2018	Center for Open Science
EdArXiv	Education	A Preprint Server For The Education Research Community	>100	2019	Center for Open Science
engrXiv	Engineering	Open archive of engineering preprints	>1,000	2016	Open Engineering Inc
ESSOAr	Earth science	Earth and space science preprints and conference posters	>1,000	2018	American Geophysical Union, Atypon, & Wiley
Eyexiv	Vision science	The Eye Open Repository, Preprints founded by Dr. F. Heidary for ophthalmology, optometry, and vision science	>100	2022	International Virtual Ophthalmic Research Center
E-LIS	Library science	Eprints in Library and Information Science	>10,000	2003	E-LIS Governance & CIEPI
F1000 Research	Life Sciences	Preprint server with integrated option of peer review by invited experts, suggested by the authors, done openly after publication	>1,000	2012	F1000 Research Ltd
figshare	Multidisciplinary	Open content repository	unknown	2011	Springer Nature
FocUS Archive	Ultrasound research	A free preprint service for the focused ultrasound research community	<100	2018	Center for Open Science
Frenxiv	Multidisciplinary	French server for preprints. Closed.	>100	2018–2022	Center for Open Science
Gates Open Research	Multidisciplinary	A platform for rapid author-led publication and open peer review of research funded by the Bill & Melinda Gates Foundation	>100	2017	Bill & Melinda Gates Foundation
HAL	Multidisciplinary	Open archive for scholarly documents from all academic fields	>1,000,000	2001	Centre pour la communication scientifique directe
HRB Open Research	Medicine	A preprint platform for HRB-funded researchers	>100	2018	Health Research Board & F1000 Research Ltd.
hprints	Arts and humanities	Nordic Arts and Humanities and Social Sciences Open Access repository	>100	2008	French National Centre for Scientific Research & Nordbib
INArxiv	Multidisciplinary	Preprint server for interdisciplinary research in Indonesia	>10,000	2017–2020	Center for Open Science
IndiaRxiv	Multidisciplinary	Preprint server for interdisciplinary research in India	>100	2019	Open Access India, Center for Open Science & Society for Promotion of Horticulture
Jxiv	Multidisciplinary	Preprint server in Japan	>100	2022	Japan Science and Technology Agency
JMIR Preprints	Medicine	Preprint server by publisher JMIR Publications mainly for open review of JMIR submissions	>100	2009	JMIR Publications
LatArXiv Preprints	Multidisciplinary	Preprint repository focused on early dissemination and citation of research primarily in the Latin American context.	>100	2024	Paideia Publishing Services
LawArXiv	Law	Archive for legal research	>1,000	2017–2020	Center for Open Science
LISSA	Library science	Library and Information Sciences Scholarship Archive	>100	2018	Center for Open Science
LingBuzz	Linguistics	Preprint server for linguistics, covering phonology, semantics, syntax, morphology, and diachronic linguistics	>10,000	2004(?)	University of Tromsø
MarXiv	Marine science	Repository for ocean and marine-climate science. Closed.	>100	2017–2020	Center for Open Science
MediArXiv	Communication sciences	Preprints for media, film, and communication research	>100	2019	Center for Open Science
medRxiv	Medicine	Open access preprint archive for medicine	>10,000	2019	Cold Spring Harbor Laboratory
MetaArXiv	Multidisciplinary	Focused on improving research transparency and reproducibility	>100	2018	Center for Open Science
MindRxiv	Multidisciplinary	Preprints on mind and contemplative practices	>100	2018	Center for Open Science
Nature Precedings	Multidisciplinary	Preprint repository of scholarly work in the fields of biomedical sciences, chemistry, and earth sciences	>1,000	2007–2012	Nature Publishing Group
NutriXiv	Nutritional sciences	Preprint service for the nutritional sciences	<100	2018	Center for Open Science
Optimization Online	Mathematics	Eprint repository for optimization topics	>10,000	2000	Mathematical Optimization Society & Wisconsin institute
OSF Preprints	Multidisciplinary	Aggregates over 30 preprint servers (all from COS plus other like arXiv, bioRxiv, etc.). Number of native OSF Preprints documents: 25,114.	>1,000,000	2017	Center for Open Science
PaleorXiv	Paleontology	Preprint server for paleontology	>100	2017	Center for Open Science
PeerJ PrePrints	Biology, medicine	Initially, developed as preprint server for PeerJ submissions. Closed Sep 30th 2019.	>1,000	2013–2019	O'Reilly Media & SAGE Publishing
PhilArchive	Philosophy	A preprint archive for philosophy affiliated with PhilPapers	>10,000	2009	PhilPapers Foundation
PhilSci-Archive	Philosophy of science	An archive for preprints in philosophy of science	>10,000	2001	D-Scribe Digital Publishing
Preprints with The Lancet	Medicine	Preprints available via SSRN	>1,000	2018	Elsevier
Preprints.org	Multidisciplinary	Preprint server for interdisciplinary research governed by MDPI	>124,000	2016	MDPI
Preprints.ru	Multidisciplinary	Preprint server for interdisciplinary research in Russia	>100	2019	NEICON
PsyArXiv	Psychology	Open access preprint archive for psychology	>10,000	2016	Society for the Improvement of Psychological Science
Qeios	Multidisciplinary	Open access, open peer review scientific publishing platform	>1000	2019	Qeios
RePEc	Economics	Research in economics	>1,000,000	1997	Federal Reserve Bank of St. Louis
Research Square	Multidisciplinary	Preprint server plus editing (commercial)	>100,000	2018	Research Square R&D LLC
Rutgers Optimality Archive	Linguistics	A distribution point for research in Optimality Theory and its conceptual affiliates	>1,000	1993	School of Arts and Sciences at Rutgers University
SciELO Preprints	Multidisciplinary	Interdisciplinary research for Latin America, Iberian Peninsula, South Africa	>10,000	2020	SciELO
ScienceOpen	Multidisciplinary	A research and discovery network allowing scholars with at least 5 publications to freely review preprints.	>1,000,000	2013	ScienceOpen
SocArXiv	Social science	Open archive of the social sciences	>10,000	2016	Center for Open Science
SportRxiv	Sports science	Repository dedicated to sport and exercise related research	>100	2017	Center for Open Science
SSRN (First Look)	Multidisciplinary	Aggregates over 30 preprint servers (Preprints with The Lancet, Cell Sneak Peek, etc.). More than 55 disciplines. Initially funded by SSRN in 1994, bought in 2016 by Elsevier.	>1,000,000	1994	Elsevier
TechRxiv	Engineering	Preprints in Technology Research	>10,000	2020	Institute of Electrical and Electronics Engineers
ViXra	Multidisciplinary	Mainly physics and mathematics, but also other. An alternative to arXiv. Well-known for also having many unorthodox papers and also fringe science.	>10,000	2009	Scientific God Inc.
Wellcome Open Research	Multidisciplinary	At least one of the authors must be a Wellcome researcher	>100	2017	Wellcome Trust
WikiJournal Preprints	Multidisciplinary	Preprint repository of scholarly work in a MediaWiki format	<100	2017	WikiJournal User Group
Zenodo	Multidisciplinary	Preprint repository of scholarly work	>100,000	2011	OpenAIRE / CERN
Synthical	Multidisciplinary	Open access preprint repository for computer science, mathematics, economics, physics, cryptography, biology, and chemistry	>1,000,000	2023	Synthical

== See also ==
- List of academic journals by preprint policy
- List of copyright policies of academic publishers
- List of research funders by preprint licensing policy
