= EngrXiv =

Open archive of engineering preprints

engrXiv
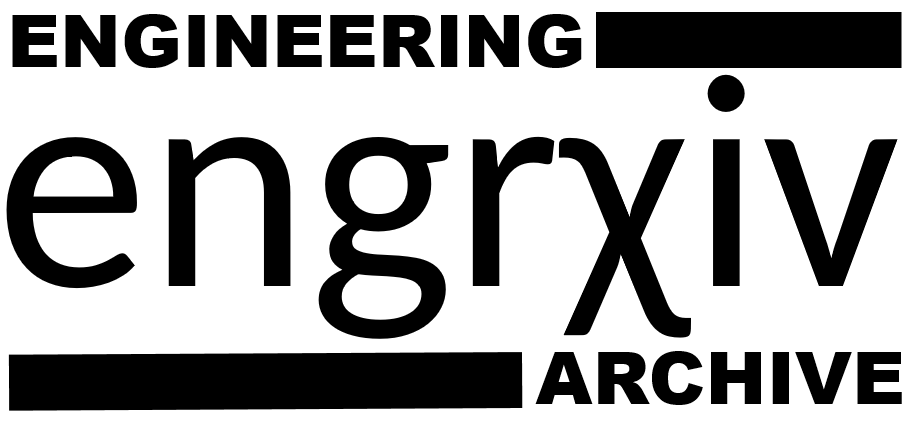
- Website type: Science
- Available in: English
- Owner: Open Engineering Inc
- Website: engrxiv.org
- Commercial: No
- Launched: July 2016; 10 years ago
- Current status: Online

engrXiv (Engineering Archive) is a preprint repository for engineering launched in July 2016. In 2019, it was announced that engrXiv was legally becoming a part of Open Engineering Inc, a 501(c)(3) nonprofit organization for the promotion of open practices in the engineering field. Open Engineering also operates The Journal of Open Engineering. Open Engineering Inc (openENGR) is a non-profit organization based in Menomonie, Wisconsin, for the "promotion of open practices in the engineering field."

It is hosted by the Public Knowledge Project Publishing Services and administrated by Dr. Devin R. Berg of Open Engineering Inc and the University of Wisconsin–Stout. engrXiv is directed by a steering committee of engineers and members of the engineering librarian community.

A paper template for submissions to engrXiv is available online via Overleaf. As of April 2017, engrXiv content was indexed in Google Scholar.

== See also ==
- List of academic journals by preprint policy
- List of preprint repositories
- Center for Open Science
- Grey literature
- Self-archiving
