= Copyright policies of academic publishers =

This is a summary of the different copyright policies of academic publishers for books, book chapters, and journal articles.

== Publishing models ==
Academic publishers fall broadly into two categories: subscription and open access, which take different approaches to copyright.

Subscription publishers typically require transfer of copyright ownership from the authors to the publisher, with the publisher monetising articles behind paywalls. The final version of an article as copyedited and typeset by the publisher is typically called the version of record. Such publishers sometimes allow certain rights to their authors, including permission to reuse parts of the paper in the author's future work, to distribute a limited number of copies. In the print format, such copies are called reprints; in the electronic format, they are called postprints.

Open access publishers allow authors to retain their copyright, but attach a reuse license to the work so that it can be hosted by the publisher and openly shared, reused and adapted. Such publishers are funded either by charging authors article processing fees (gold OA) or by subsidy from a larger organisation (diamond OA).

== Academic books and book chapters ==
Academic book publishing policies are not consolidated into a single database (in contrast to the SHERPA/RoMEO database of journal policies). However, a relatively small number of academic book publishers dominate the market. Most publishers permit self-archiving of the postprint version of the author's own chapter (if contributed to only one chapter) or 10% of the total book (if contributed to multiple chapters). The notable exception is Elsevier, which is the largest publisher to not permit chapter archiving under any circumstances.

Publisher	Self-archiving	Version	Permitted license	Embargo (months)	Source
Bloomsbury	Permitted (Note: author's own chapter (if contributed to only one chapter) or 10% of the total book (if contributed to multiple chapters))	Published	All rights reserved (Note: i.e. may not be re-published, enhanced, enriched or otherwise transformed into a derivative work without permission from original publisher)	6	
Cambridge University Press	Permitted	Postprint	All rights reserved	6	
De Gruyter	Permitted	Postprint		12	
Elsevier	Author must email to request permission	-	-	-	
Emerald	Permitted (Note: author's own chapter (if contributed to only one chapter) or full book (if contributed to multiple chapters))	Postprint	CC BY-NC	0	
Oxford University Press	Permitted	Postprint	All rights reserved	24 (HASS) or 12 (STEM)	
Routledge / Taylor & Francis	Permitted	Postprint	no license restrictions	18 (HASS) or 12 (STEM)	
SAGE (reference handbooks)	Permitted	Postprint	no license restrictions	24	
SAGE (academic books, professional books, textbooks)	Forbidden	-	-	-	
Springer Nature	Permitted	Postprint	All rights reserved	24	
Wiley	Author must email to request permission	-	All rights reserved	-	

== Academic journals ==
Academic journal publishing policies focus on two main aspects: Whether a preprint article already openly shared can be submitted to a journal, and what version of the article can be subsequently openly shared after peer review has been concluded.

Typical publishing workflow for an academic journal article (preprint, postprint, and published) with open access sharing rights per SHERPA/RoMEO.

=== Preprints ===
Academic publishers will not publish work that has already been published elsewhere, so a key issue has been the interpretation of a preprint server. Traditionally, academics have circulated pre-submission copies of their articles for informal feedback. However, open preprint servers since the 1990s increased the scale and visibility of this process and raised the question as to whether this constituted 'prior publication' or merely 'sharing'.

The majority of academic journal publishers now accept submission of articles that have already been shared as preprints, with copyright of this version remaining with the author by default.

=== Postprints ===
The sharing of postprints (the last version of an article after peer review but before copyright is transferred to a publisher) has become increasingly permitted by academic journal publishers, typically after an embargo of 6-18 months. Journal policies are consolidated in the SHERPA/RoMEO database.

=== Published articles ===
The copyright of the final published version of record may reside with the authors or the publisher depending on the publisher's business model. For journals following a subscription model, where articles are accessed via a paywall, copyright is transferred from author to publisher. Sharing of the final formatted article is therefore typically never permitted.

The rise of "gold" open access academic journals stands in contrast to this, where copyright is retained by the author and a reuse license (typically a creative commons variant) applied.

== See also ==
- List of academic journals
- List of open-access journals
- Springer Nature
- Elsevier
- Wiley-Blackwell
- Taylor & Francis
- SAGE Publications
