= AfricArXiv =

Open-access repository for academic preprints

AfricArXiv is an open-access repository for preprints of academic publications which are either about Africa or by African scientists. The platform was established in 2018. It was established to make preprint servers more available in various fields and regions. Its establishment happen during trends to provide more digital services to support science in Africa.

From its founding the platform welcomed publications in any African language. In July 2020 the platform began hosting audio and video files.

The Center for Open Science hosts the platform. The cost of operating the servers is significant and that organization takes a fee to cover its costs.

Preprints can be submitted to AfricArXiv via ScienceOpen. Users need to have a verified ORCID digital identifier and should include in their manuscripts a short summary translation in a traditional African language. After a member of the AfricArXiv team has checked the submission for formal criteria and approved the manuscript, it will be posted with a Crossref DOI and CC BY 4.0 attribution license.

== See also ==
- List of preprint repositories

== Further consideration ==
- Ahinon, Justin Sègbédji; Arafat, Hisham; Ahmad, Umar; Achampong, Joyce; Aldirdiri, Osman; Ayodele, Obasegun Tekena; Okelo, Luke; Bezuidenhout, Louise; Cary, Michael; Fath, Nada; Ksibi, Nabil Aziz; Nasr, Fayza; Nguemeni, Carine; Maina, Mahmoud Bukar; Mensah, Priscilla; Obanda, Johanssen; Owango, Joy; Ogunlaja, Ahmed; Simpson, Gregory; Havemann, Johanna (25 September 2020). "AfricArXiv – the pan-African Open Scholarly Repository (Overview and Roadmap)". doi:10.31730/osf.io/56p3e. S2CID 242390278.
