= Manuscript (publishing) =

Work that an author submits to a publisher or editor for publication

A manuscript is the work that an author submits to a publisher, editor, or producer for publication. Especially in academic publishing, manuscript can also refer to an accepted document, reviewed but not yet in a final format, distributed in advance as a preprint.

This use of the term manuscript (from Latin for "hand written") originally dates from a time when only final published documents were professionally typeset and printed, but preliminary drafts were written by hand. Once typewriters became widespread, many manuscripts were typewritten. Today manuscripts are usually prepared using computers with digital typesetting or word processing software.

== Manuscript format ==
Even with desktop publishing making it possible for writers to prepare text that appears professionally typeset, many publishers still require authors to submit manuscripts formatted according to their respective guidelines. Manuscript formatting varies greatly depending on the type of work, as well as the particular publisher, editor or producer. Writers who intend to submit a manuscript should determine what the relevant writing standards are, and follow them.

Although publishers’ guidelines for formatting are the most critical resource for authors, style guides are also key references since "virtually all professional editors work closely with one of them in editing a manuscript for publication." Nonetheless, individual publishers' standards always take precedence over style guides.

Publishers of literary works such as short stories and poetry often expect submissions in standard manuscript format, which is easily distinguishable from most published material.

== Preprint ==
An ordinary manuscript only becomes a "publisher's preprint" if it somehow gets distributed beyond the authors (or the occasional colleague whom they ask for advice). A future "final print" must be planned – with better layout, proofreading, prepress proofing, etc. – that will replace the "preprinted manuscript".

- In a peer review context: if an author prepares a manuscript on their computer and submits it to a publisher for review but it is not accepted, there cannot be a "publisher's preprint".
- In a web context (legal/cultural authorship): to demonstrate authorship, an author can upload a version of their work to a repository before full publication. An alternative could be to use a legal deposit.

== See also ==
- Center for Open Science
- Cogprints
- Cryptology ePrint Archive
- Draft document
- Grey literature
- List of academic journals by preprint policy
- Prepress
- Postprint
- ScientificCommons
- Self-archiving
