= Open Archives Initiative =

Informal organisation

Logo used by the Open Archives Initiative.

The Open Archives Initiative (OAI) was an informal organization, in the circle around the colleagues Herbert Van de Sompel, Carl Lagoze, Michael L. Nelson and Simeon Warner, and arxiv.org to develop and apply technical interoperability standards for archives to share catalogue information (metadata). The group got together in the late late 1990s and was active for around twenty years. OAI coordinated in particular three specification activities: OAI-PMH, OAI-ORE and ResourceSync. All along the group worked towards building a "low-barrier interoperability framework" for archives (institutional repositories) containing digital content (digital libraries) to allow people (service providers) to harvest metadata (from data providers). Such sets of metadata are since then harvested to provide "value-added services", often by combining different data sets.

OAI has been involved in developing a technological framework and interoperability standards for enhancing access to eprint archives, which make scholarly communications like academic journals available, associated with the open access publishing movement. The relevant technology and standards are applicable beyond scholarly publishing.

The OAI technical infrastructure, specified in the Protocol for Metadata Harvesting (OAI-PMH) version 2.0, defines a mechanism for data providers to expose their metadata. This protocol mandates that individual archives map their metadata to the Dublin Core, a common metadata set for this purpose. OAI standards allow a common way to provide content, and part of those standards is that the content has metadata that describes the items in Dublin Core format. Object Reuse and Exchange (OAI-ORE) defines standards for the description and exchange of aggregations of web resources.

Funding for the initiative came from the Andrew W. Mellon Foundation, Coalition for Networked Information (CNI), Digital Library Federation (DLF), National Science Foundation (NSF), the Alfred P. Sloan Foundation, and other organizations.

== See also ==
- Analytical Sciences Digital Library (ASDL)
- Digital preservation
- National Digital Library Program (NDLP)
- National Digital Information Infrastructure and Preservation Program (NDIIPP)
- Scientific Commons
- Self-archiving
- E-Theses Online Service EThOS a service provided by the British Library using OAI
- World Wide Molecular Matrix (WWMM)
