= PsyArXiv =

Psychology online preprint service

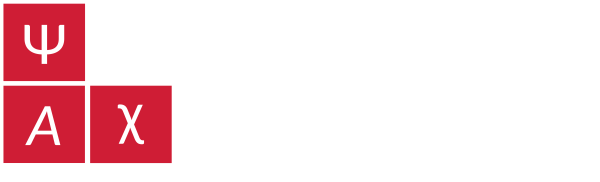
- Website type: Science
- Available in: English
- Owner: Society for the Improvement of Psychological Science
- Website: psyarxiv.com
- Commercial: No
- Launched: September 2016; 10 years ago
- Current status: Online

PsyArXiv is a preprint repository for the psychological sciences opened in September 2016 and officially launched in December 2016. It is hosted by the Center for Open Science. The preprint service was inspired by the arXiv repository. The service allows researchers to upload manuscripts regarding psychology and related fields prior to peer review. As of April 2017, it is indexed by Google Scholar.

== Fields ==
PsyArXiv accepted submissions in the following areas of research:

- Applied behavior analysis
- Biological psychology
- Child psychology
- Clinical psychology
- Cognition and perception
- Cognitive psychology
- Community psychology
- Counseling psychology
- Cultural psychology
- Developmental psychology
- Experimental analysis of behavior
- Health psychology
- Industrial and organizational psychology
- Linguistics
- Neuroscience and neurobiology
- Operations research, systems engineering and industrial engineering
- Pain management
- Personality and social contexts
- Quantitative psychology
- School psychology
- Social psychology
- Theory and philosophy of psychology

== See also ==
- List of preprint repositories
