= Research Square =

Preprint server

- Website type: Science
- Available in: English
- Owner: Springer Nature
- Website: https://www.researchsquare.com/
- Launched: 2013; 13 years ago
- Current status: Online
- ISSN: 2693-5015

Research Square is an open-access platform of electronic preprints approved for posting after moderation, but not peer review.

The predecessor of Research Square was American Journal Experts. The platform, Research Square, was established in 2013 and acquired by Springer Nature in 2022.

The server accepts submissions from all fields of research, such as physical, biomedical, and social sciences. As of May 2023, Research Square contains more than 223,000 preprints.

Pre-prints uploaded to Research Square must have a CC-BY license. If it was uploaded elsewhere under a different license (eg. CC-BY-SA) it would violate the terms of that license.

== See also ==
- List of academic databases and search engines
- List of academic journals by preprint policy
- Open-access repository
- List of preprint repositories
