= Preprints.org =

Open-access repository

- Website type: Science
- Available in: English
- Owner: MDPI
- Website: www.preprints.org
- Launched: 2016; 10 years ago
- Current status: Online

Preprints.org is an open-access platform of electronic preprints approved for posting after moderation. Research in various areas can be posted as preprints on Preprints.org, including manuscripts from all fields of research.

Preprints was established by MDPI in 2016. As of March 2026, Preprints.org contains more than 124,000 preprints.

== Abstracting and indexing ==
As of May 2023, preprints posted on Preprints.org appear in:

- Web of Science (Preprint Citation Index)
- Europe PMC
- Crossref
- Google Scholar
- PrePubMed
- Portico

== See also ==
- List of academic databases and search engines
- List of academic journals by preprint policy
- Open-access repository
- List of preprint repositories
