= Richard Sever =

Researcher

Richard Sever is the co-founder of BioRxiv, the scientific community's primary preprint server for biology research, and is a leading figure in the open science movement. He was recognized in 2025 by Time 100 for his contributions to the research community via BioRxiv and MedRxiv, which facilitated the rapid dissemination of research during the COVID-19 pandemic.

Sever currently serves as Chief Science and Strategy Officer for openRxiv, a non-profit organization created to run the two preprint servers independently of Cold Spring Harbor Laboratory, where BioRxiv was previously run. Together, the servers publish thousands of scientific articles each month, and have done consistently since 2020.
