= List of research funders by preprint licensing policy =

This is a list of funders of research by their open licensing policies for preprints. With the exception of some government employees and contractors, the majority of authors keep the copyright to their work. Many funders require their grantees to disseminate the work using licenses with specific reuse rights. Other details of funder open access policies can be found at the Registry of Open Access Repositories and the Open Policy Finder from JISC (formerly SHERPA).

== Policies by funder ==
CC BY, NC and ND refer to the Creative Commons licenses and CC0 is a public domain dedication.
Funder	License for Preprints	Is the Preprint License Recommended or Required?	Notes	Source
Aligning Science Across Parkinson's	CC BY or CC0	Required		
Astera Institute	CC BY or CC0	Required		
European Molecular Biology Laboratory	CC BY	Required		
Gates Foundation	CC BY	Required		
Howard Hughes Medical Institute	CC BY	Required		Under the Immediate Access to Research policy, initial and revised preprints under a CC BY license are required for all major contributions from HHMI researchers.
Michael J. Fox Foundation	None specified	N/A	Policy does require free readership rights on preprints	
Simons Foundation	Open Access licenses (generally)	Required		
Templeton World Charity	CC BY	Strongly encouraged		
Wellcome Trust	CC BY	Strongly encouraged	Required if preprint is used for policy compliance.	

== Exceptions for government employees and contractors ==
In some countries, work performed by government employees or contractors is owned by the government and subject to their licensing stipulations. For example, in the US, work performed by government employees, such as employees of the NIH is deemed Public Domain in the US, and the US government holds copyright elsewhere. Government licensing policies may override funder requirements.

== See also ==
- List of academic publishers by preprint policy
