= Bioinformatics Research Network =

US non-profit organization

Bioinformatics Research Network (BRN) is a non-profit open-science research-based organization aiming to provide volunteer opportunities and bioinformatics research training that is free and open to everyone. It is a community-driven 501(c)(3) non-profit organization that aims to establish a worldwide network that is open to anyone interested in bioinformatics irrespective of academic background and to provide bioinformatics training, mentorship and the opportunity to collaborate on exciting research projects.

== Training and projects ==
BRN provides free training workshops through its partner group Bioinformatics Interest Group. BIG is a student club of The University of Texas Health Science Center at San Antonio established to promote the development of student bioinformaticians and encourage the growth of bioinformatics skills in the community. BRN is open to academic labs to host projects for open collaboration. These projects are then available for everyone to contribute. To work on a project, a volunteer has to complete the required skill assessments for the specific project and apply to the respected team. The decision to allow the volunteer to work depends on the team of the respective project.

== Publication ==
BRN has published its projects in BioRxiv and in peer-reviewed journals.
