= ViXra =

Electronic e-print archive for unconventional publications

viXra
- Website type: e-print archive
- Available in: English
- Owner: Scientific God Inc.
- Founder: Philip Gibbs
- Website: vixra.org
- Commercial: No
- Launched: 2009
- Current status: Online

viXra is an electronic e-print archive known for unorthodox and fringe science. It was set up by independent physicist Philip Gibbs as an alternative to the dominant arXiv service, then operated by Cornell University. Its name comes from arXiv spelled backwards.

== Description ==
Although dominated by physics and mathematics submissions, viXra aims to cover topics across the whole scientific community. It accepts submissions without requiring authors to have an academic affiliation and without any threshold for quality. The e-prints on viXra are grouped into seven broad categories: physics, mathematics, computational science, biology, chemistry, humanities, and other areas. Anyone may post anything on viXra, though house rules do prohibit "vulgar, libellous, plagiaristic or dangerously misleading" content. As a result, the site has a reputation among physicists for hosting "material of no interest". Physicist Gerard 't Hooft writes, "When a paper is published in viXra, it is usually a sign that it is not likely to contain acceptable results. It may, but the odds against that are considerable".

Gibbs originally started the archive to cater to researchers who believed that their preprints had been unfairly rejected or reclassified by the arXiv moderators. As of 2013, it had over 4000 preprints, and by December 2020, the number had grown to 36,321. A 2020 study of preprint servers found that as of September of that year, viXra hosted 440 preprints about COVID-19.

viXra uses the same article numbering schema as arXiv: yymm.iiiii, where y stands for last two digits of the year, m stands for the month, and i stands for a sequential index among articles sent during the month.

== See also ==
- List of preprint repositories
