= PLOS Currents =

- Language: English

Publication details
- History: 2009–2018
- Publisher: Public Library of Science (United States)
- License: Creative Commons Attribution 3.0

Standard abbreviations
- ISO 4: PLOS Curr.

Indexing
- ISSN: 2157-3999
- OCLC no.: 436157303

Links
- Journal homepage

PLOS Currents was a publishing platform run by the Public Library of Science from 2009 to 2018 as an experiment.

== Format ==
The platform was created as an experiment in open access rapid communication and to handle non-standard publication formats (negative results, single experiments, research in progress, protocols, datasets). It also allowed people to leave post-publication comments. These features are similar to those now commonly found in preprint servers. The platform used the open-source Annotum software for drafting articles online.

Submitted articles were reviewed by "moderators" (a select group of researchers in the journal's field) and were peer-reviewed.

Articles are archived in PubMed Central, and indexed in PubMed as well as Scopus.

== History ==
The PLOS Currents platform was launched in 2009. It had a particularly high submission rate during the 2014 Ebola epidemic and the 2015–2016 Zika virus epidemic.

It ceased accepting new submissions in August 2018 due to the software platform becoming outdated, leading to a reduction in user experience and submission rate. PLOS instead pivoted to closer collaboration with services such as BioRxiv.

== Journals ==
The platform had six sections.

- PLOS Currents: Disasters (2012–2018)
- PLOS Currents: Evidence on Genomic Tests (2010–2018)
- PLOS Currents: Huntington Disease (2010–2018)
- PLOS Currents: Muscular Dystrophy (2011–2018)
- PLOS Currents: Outbreaks (2013–2018); previously PLOS Currents: Influenza (2009–2013)
- PLOS Currents: Tree of Life (2010–2018)
