= Repositories Support Project =

The Repository Support Project (RSP) was a 7-year Jisc funded project set up to support and develop the UK network of institutional repositories. It was originally funded through to March 2009, but was then extended to run until early 2011. The project ceased on 31 July 2013.

Original project partners were:

- SHERPA (organisation), University of Nottingham (lead)
- Aberystwyth University
- UKOLN, University of Bath
- Digital Curation Centre (DCC), University of Bath
- University of Southampton

The project aimed to develop a network of interoperable repositories for all kinds of research outputs and data across the UK.
