= ScientificCommons =

Scientific Commons
- Founded: September 2006
- Founder: Thomas Nicolai, Lars Kirchhoff, and Beat F. Schmid
- Type: Non-profit organization
- Purpose: Building infrastructure for access to scientific publications
- Location: St.Gallen, Switzerland
- Website: scientificcommons.org

ScientificCommons was a project of the University of St. Gallen Institute for Media and Communications Management. The major aim of the project was to develop the world's largest archive of scientific knowledge with fulltexts freely accessible to the public. The project was closed down in 2014.

ScientificCommons included a search engine for publications and author profiles. It also allowed the user to turn searches into customized RSS feeds of new publications. ScientificCommons also provided a fulltext caching service for researchers.

Starting from the beginning of 2013, ScientificCommons has been inaccessible. All visitors were forwarded to an administration login for server virtualization management software Proxmox VE and the site is no longer issuing a valid TLS certificate.

== Function ==
ScientificCommons had no registration wall for searchers, but repositories that were not indexed can register by name and the OAI interface URL. It used the Open Archives Initiative Protocol for Metadata Harvesting (OAI-PMH) to extract data. Only OAI-compliant repositories and personal websites that have been enhanced through Dublin Core in their HTML headers could be included in the index.

ScientificCommons strongly supported self-archiving, a legal way for authors to make publications from over 90% of scientific journals available, often called the "green road to open access". The maintainers suggested that scientists should refuse to publish with any journal which will not allow them to self-archive.

Apart from the metadata scraped from repositories, lexical and statistical methods were used to index keywords. Citations were also extracted from the bulk text. This data were used in the search engine and RSS feeds.

ScientificCommons was designed to work with Zotero.

Because it was made in German-speaking Switzerland, the web interface was also available in German. The majority of the information was in the language of publication, however.

== Statistics ==
As of August 2008, Scientific Commons had:

- 21,022,206 Metadata Records
- 8,510,882 Authors
- 916 repositories

== See also ==
- Creative Commons
- Dublin Core
- Open access publishing
- Open Archives Initiative
- Self-archiving
