= Journal of Orthopaedic Research =

- Discipline: Orthopaedics
- Language: English
- Edited by: Linda J. Sandell

Publication details
- History: 1983–present
- Publisher: Wiley-Liss on behalf of the Orthopaedic Research Society
- Frequency: Monthly
- Impact factor: 2.8 (2022)

Standard abbreviations
- ISO 4: J. Orthop. Res.

Indexing
- CODEN: JOREDR
- ISSN: 0736-0266 (print); 1554-527X (web)
- OCLC no.: 09069401

Links
- Journal homepage; Online access; Online archive

The Journal of Orthopaedic Research is a peer-reviewed medical journal of orthopaedics published by Wiley-Liss on behalf of the Orthopaedic Research Society. It was established in 1983 and the editor-in-chief is Dr. Edward M. Schwarz, Ph.D.(University of Rochester). According to the Journal Citation Reports, the journal has a 2022 impact factor of 2.8, ranking it 27th out of 86 journals in the category "Orthopedics".
