= Nature Precedings =

- Discipline: Interdisciplinary
- Language: English

Publication details
- History: 2007–2012
- Publisher: Nature Publishing Group (United Kingdom)

Standard abbreviations
- ISO 4: Nat. Preced.

Indexing
- ISSN: 1756-0357

Links
- Journal homepage

Nature Precedings was an open access electronic preprint repository of scholarly work in the fields of biomedical sciences, chemistry, and earth sciences. It ceased accepting new submissions as of April 3, 2012.

Nature Precedings functioned as a permanent, citable archive for pre-publication research and preliminary findings. It was a place for researchers to share documents, including presentations, posters, white papers, technical papers, supplementary findings, and non-peer-reviewed manuscripts. It provided a rapid way to share preliminary findings, disseminate emerging results, solicit community feedback, and claim priority over discoveries. The content was curated and developed by the Nature Publishing Group.

== Description ==
Nature Precedings was started in June 2007 by the Nature Publishing Group under the direction of Timo Hannay, its director for web publishing. The British Library, the European Bioinformatics Institute, Science Commons, and the Wellcome Trust were partners. Nature Precedings supported the Open Archives Initiative Protocol for Metadata Harvesting (OAI-PMH, version 2). Although content is solely author-copyrighted, it can be used under the terms of the Creative Commons Attribution License, versions 2.5 or 3.0.

Documents that were manuscripts, preliminary reports, white papers, or presentations reporting work in the fields of biology, chemistry, earth sciences, or medicine (except clinical trial results) could be submitted for posting. Physics and mathematics were excluded as they are already covered by the arXiv preprint server. Submissions could be revised after posting, although the original submission remained and revisions were made available for access as newer versions. Submitted documents were not reviewed by editors or experts, and "genuine contributions from qualified scientists" were accepted for immediate posting. Non-scientific or pseudo-scientific work was rejected. Submitters were expected to have copyrights and appropriate permissions for material presented in the submitted documents. Opportunity for non-anonymous, informal peer review was available through a commenting system on the Nature Precedings website.

A Nature Precedings preprint is cited like a traditional journal article. However, the preprint's DOI is used as the document identifier instead of journal volume, issue, and page numbers. Scientists and journal publishers have expressed concerns regarding preprint submissions to Nature Precedings and whether these submissions would lead to violations of the Ingelfinger rule, a policy in which journals will not publish a manuscript if its findings have been reported elsewhere.

== Growth ==
Fifty-five preprints were posted in the first 15 days of Nature Precedings. Of those, 26 were submitted as manuscripts and 29 as posters/presentations. Corresponding numbers for the first 50 days were 89, 48, and 41, and for the first six months, 303, 227, and 76. About 500 and 650 preprints were published during the first and second years, respectively. The growth of the repository can be tracked graphically on the Scientific Commons page for Nature Precedings.

== Abstracting and indexing ==
The journal is abstracted and indexed in Scopus.
