= ScienceOpen =

- Headquarters: Berlin, Germany
- Website: scienceopen.com

ScienceOpen is a web-based platform, that hosts open access journals. It is freely accessible for readers, authors and publishers, and it generates its revenues via promotional services for publishers and authors' institutions. The organization is based in Berlin and has a technical office in Boston. It is a member of CrossRef, ORCID, the Open Access Scholarly Publishers Association, STM Association and the Directory of Open Access Journals. The company was designated as one of “10 to Watch” by research advisory firm Outsell in its report “Open Access 2015: Market Size, Share, Forecast, and Trends.”

== History ==
ScienceOpen began in 2013 when Alexander Grossmann, a professor of Publishing Management at the Leipzig University of Applied Sciences and former publishing director at scholarly publishing house De Gruyter, and Tibor Tscheke, president and CEO of the content management system company Ovitas, decided to start a platform that would allow researchers to share scientific information, both formally by publishing articles and participating in post-publication peer review, and informally by reviewing their colleagues’ work, providing endorsements and comments, and by updating their own papers.

Its beta version was introduced in November 2013, and release 1.0 launched in May 2014. In September 2015, ScienceOpen hit the 10 million article record mark. In June 2016 they announced their partnership with SciELO, the largest publisher in Latin America, to enable discovery of SciELO content in ScienceOpen. Additional publishing partners include UCL Press, Emerald Publishing, Cold Spring Harbor Laboratory Press, PeerJ, Open Library of the Humanities, Microbiology Society, Karger, Equinox, Hogrefe, EDPSciences, UTS ePRESS, Higher Education Press, Europe's Journal for Psychology, the Italian Society of Victimology and more.

As of January 2018, the site had 38 million articles and records from PubMed Central, ArXiv, PubMed, SciELO, and numerous individual publishers. ScienceOpen provides a publicly available citation index which is free for researchers to use wherever they are and is provided at no cost to libraries, which in February 2016 was dubbed the Open Citation Index.

== Business model ==
ScienceOpen offers open access journal hosting services, as well as advanced indexing and promotional services that showcase customer content within the discovery platform.

Every research article on ScienceOpen has a traceable genealogy through citations, a public peer review process, and social interaction tracked by altmetrics, which they call research "context". The technology behind the ScienceOpen platform is provided by Ovitas.

ScienceOpen appoints members of the research community as Collection Editors who curate articles from multiple publishers in any topic. Collections support discovery of and within research communities. All content on the platform is available for post-publication peer review by scientific members with five or more peer-reviewed publications on their ORCID, and all articles can be publicly commented on by members with one or more items.

The primary intent of ScienceOpen originally was to provide a platform to provide a peer-review for and publish Open Access science articles. Authors can upload their manuscripts free of charge onto ScienceOpen Preprints, where they immediately receive a DOI number. After this the authors need to invite potential reviewers for their manuscript. After received the reviews, the authors can modify their manuscript and submit the second version, which is usually accepted for publication. After having received at least 2 independent reviews with recommendation for acceptance, the authors have an option to publish their work on ScienceOpen Research for 400 US$. After several years of operation, on 2022-08-01 ScienceOpen lists 115 reviews (with only 2 negative) and 77 publications.

ScienceOpen Posters allows academics to publish conference posters so that they can reach a wider audience than those who were present at their conference.

There are several other web services in the same market niche as ScienceOpen, but they have been even less successful in attracting customers: Qeios, PREreview.org, Hypothesis, F1000, Publons, PubPeer, PubPub.

== Headquarters ==
ScienceOpen has its headquarters located at Pappelallee 78-79, 10437 Berlin, Germany and its technical hub is at 131 Hartwell Ave, Lexington, MA 02421, USA.

== See also ==
- Open Access Scholarly Publishers Association (OASPA)
- Directory of Open Access Journals (DOAJ)
- Registry of Open Access Repositories Mandatory Archiving Policies (ROARMAP)
- Open access in Germany
- List of academic databases and search engines
