= BioRxiv =

Preprint service

bioRxiv
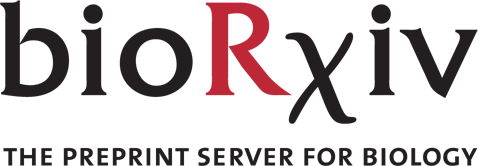
- Website type: Science
- Available in: English
- Owner: openRxiv
- Website: biorxiv.org
- Commercial: No
- Launched: November 2013; 13 years ago
- Current status: Online

bioRxiv (pronounced "bio-archive") is an open access preprint repository for the biological sciences co-founded by John Inglis and Richard Sever in November 2013. It was hosted by Cold Spring Harbor Laboratory (CSHL) until March 11, 2025, when ownership transferred to the newly formed non-profit openRxiv, dedicated to bioRxiv and medRxiv.

As preprints, papers hosted on bioRxiv are not peer-reviewed (though submissions may be undergoing peer review and peer reviews from other sources may be posted alongside preprints). However, all submissions undergo a basic scrutinization process, which includes safeguarding checks, an automated plagiarism screening and an assessment of appropriateness. Moreover, readers may post comments. The latest study indicates that the content of bioRxiv preprints rarely changes after submission to journals and subsequent peer review (in the case of accepted papers); however, the automatic process of linking preprints with their published versions might lead to the omission of a substantial number of cases.

It has been measured that two-thirds of the papers posted in bioRxiv are later published in peer-reviewed journals. BioRxiv, and its sister site, medRxiv, have been major sources for the dissemination of COVID-19 research.

== History ==
bioRxiv was inspired by and intends to complement the arXiv repository, which mostly focuses on mathematics, physics and connected disciplines, launched in 1991 by Paul Ginsparg (who also serves on the bioRxiv advisory board). It received support from both the CSHL and the Lourie Foundation. Additional funding from the Chan Zuckerberg Initiative was confirmed in April 2017.

Prior to the establishment of bioRxiv, biological scientists were divided on the issue of having a dedicated preprint open-access repository. Many had concerns of having their research scooped by competitors and losing their claim to discovery. However, several geneticists had submitted papers to the "quantitative biology" section of the arXiv repository (launched in 2003) and no longer had those concerns, as they could point to preprints to support their claims of discovery.

== Submission rate ==
Jocelyn Kaiser of Science said that in its first year, the repository had "attracted a modest but growing stream of papers", having hosted 824 preprints. Over 20,000 tweets were made about bioRxiv-hosted preprints in 2015.

February 2016, the submission rate to bioRxiv had steadily increased from ≈60 to ≈200 per month. In 2017, the number of monthly submissions rose from over 800 in March to more than 1000 in July with a total number of 10,722 papers submitted in 2017.

In the year of 2018, a total of 20,000 manuscripts were submitted, which results in a monthly average of 1600 papers.

In the year 2019, over 31,000 manuscripts were submitted, which results in a monthly average of 2600 papers (which accelerated to just over 3000 papers per month in the last quarter of 2019).

The number of yearly manuscripts rose to 38,088 in 2020, then slightly increased to 40,223 in 2021, followed by 36,417 manuscripts being published in 2022. As of December 31, 2022, almost 180,000 preprints have been accepted in total.

== Fields ==
bioRxiv accepts preprints in the following disciplines

- Animal behavior and cognition
- Biochemistry
- Bioengineering
- Bioinformatics
- Biophysics
- Cancer biology
- Cell biology
- Clinical trials
- Developmental biology
- Ecology
- Epidemiology
- Evolutionary biology
- Genetics
- Genomics
- Immunology
- Microbiology
- Molecular biology
- Neuroscience
- Paleontology
- Pathology
- Pharmacology and Toxicology
- Physiology
- Plant biology
- Scientific communication and education
- Synthetic biology
- Systems biology
- Zoology

== bioRxiv, journals, and open peer review ==
As a result of bioRxiv's popularity, many biology journals have updated their policies on preprints, clarifying they do not consider preprints to be a 'prior publication' for purpose of the Ingelfinger rule.

The bioRxiv to Journals (B2J) initiative allows authors to submit their manuscript directly to a journal's submission system through bioRxiv. As of May 2020, 177 journals participate in the initiative.

In 2019, bioRxiv started allowing posting reviews alongside preprints, in addition to allowing comments on preprints. The reviews can come from journals or from platforms such as Review Commons.

== See also ==
- List of preprint repositories
- ArXiv
- ChemRxiv
- MedRxiv
