= Eprint =

Academic documents available online

In academic publishing, an eprint or e-print is a digital version of a research document (usually a journal article, but could also be a thesis, conference paper, book chapter, or a book) that is accessible online, usually as green open access, whether from a local institutional or a central digital repository.

When applied to journal articles, the term "eprints" covers both preprints (before peer review) and postprints (after peer review).

Digital versions of materials other than research documents are not usually called e-prints, but some other name, such as e-books.

== See also ==
- Electronic article
- Electronic journal
- Electronic publishing
- Open access
- Open science
