= Japan Society for Cell Biology =

- Founded: 1950
- Website: www.jscb.gr.jp/csf/en

The Japan Society for Cell Biology is a professional society for cell biology that was founded in 1950. It has published the journal Cell Structure and Function since 1975. It also organises an annual cell biology symposium.
