= Society for the Improvement of Psychological Science =

- Formation: July 6, 2016; 9 years ago
- Type: Scientific society
- Legal status: 501(c)(3) nonprofit organization
- Website: improvingpsych.org

The Society for the Improvement of Psychological Science (SIPS) is a professional organization created in response to the replication crisis in social psychology. It was founded at its inaugural meeting that took place June 6-8th, 2016 at Center for Open Science in Charlottesville.

== Purpose ==
It is a service organization with the aims of improving the training and research practices of psychological scientists, improving institutional policies and norms to promote better scientific practices, carrying out empirical testing of current scientific practices, and conducting outreach within and outside the field.

It holds a yearly conference and publishes the journal Collabra: Psychology.

== Awards ==
The SIPS committee bestows two types of awards to projects that further the SIPS mission: the SIPS Mission Awards (once per year) and the SIPS Commendations (three times per year).
