= Version of record =

Official version of an article, published by a publisher

Typical publishing workflow for an academic journal article (preprint, postprint, and published) with open access sharing rights per SHERPA/RoMEO.

The version of record of an article is the fully copyedited, typeset and formatted copy of a manuscript as published, in contrast with earlier versions such as preprints (unaccepted manuscripts) and postprints (accepted manuscripts). The terminology is used in a wide variety of written media (e.g. books, journals, monographs).

== Description ==
For print documents, the version of record will be the version as printed and distributed. For electronic documents it is typically the HTML and PDF version. For items published in both a print and electronic version, the electronic copy is often the version of record. An article's version of record is often assigned a persistent identifier or handle (e.g. a DOI) to unambiguously disambiguate the version being referred to.

== Ownership and copyright ==
In subscription publishing models, authors transfer copyright of the version of record to the publisher and it is this version that is paywalled to generate revenue. For open access publications, copyright for the version of record is retained by the authors, with a license attached (typically a Creative Commons variant) that allows hosting by the publisher, and free reuse, sharing and adaptation.
