= Quantitative biology =

Subfield of biology

Quantitative biology is an umbrella term encompassing the use of mathematical, statistical or computational techniques to study life and living organisms. The central theme and goal of quantitative biology is the creation of predictive models based on fundamental principles governing living systems.

The subfields of biology that employ quantitative approaches include:

- Mathematical and theoretical biology
- Computational biology
- Bioinformatics
- Biostatistics
- Systems biology
- Population biology
- Synthetic biology
- Epidemiology
