= Center for Open Science =

American nonprofit organization

- Website: cos.io, osf.io
- Commercial: No
- Launched: 2013; 13 years ago
- Current status: Active

The Center for Open Science is a non-profit technology organization based in Charlottesville, Virginia with a mission to "increase the openness, integrity, and reproducibility of scientific research." Brian Nosek and Jeffrey Spies founded the organization in January 2013, funded mainly by the Laura and John Arnold Foundation and others.

The organization began with work in reproducibility of psychology research, with the large-scale initiative Reproducibility Project: Psychology. A second reproducibility project for cancer biology research has also been started through a partnership with Science Exchange. In March 2017, the Center published a detailed strategic plan. Brian Nosek posted a letter outlining the history of the Center and future directions.

In 2020, the Center received a grant from Fast Grants to promote the publication of COVID-19 research on the platform.

In 2021, the Center for Open Science was honored with the Einstein Foundation Award for Promoting Quality in Research in the institutional category for their contribution to fostering research integrity and to improving transparency and accessibility.

== Open Science Framework ==
=== Reproducibility project ===
The Open Science Framework (OSF) is an open source software project that facilitates open collaboration in science research. The framework was initially used to work on a project in the reproducibility of psychology research, but has subsequently become multidisciplinary. The current reproducibility aspect of the project is a crowdsourced empirical investigation of the reproducibility of a variety of studies from psychological literature, sampling from three major journals: Journal of Personality and Social Psychology, Psychological Science, and Journal of Experimental Psychology: Learning, Memory, and Cognition. Scientists volunteer to replicate a study of their choosing from these journals, and follow a structured protocol for designing and conducting a high-powered replication of the key effect. The results were published in 2015. In September 2026, Center for Open Science announced that OSF would quit accepting submissions of code and data. Existing public submissions would convert to read-only mode in early 2027, while any unpublished draft or private submissions would be removed. The OSF preregistration server and the preprint servers remain unchanged.

=== Preprints ===
In 2016, OSF started three new preprint services: engrXiv, SocArXiv, and (with the Society for the Improvement of Psychological Science) PsyArXiv. It subsequently opened its own preprint server in 2017, OSF Preprints. Its unified search function includes preprints from OSF Preprints, alongside those from other servers such as Preprints.org, Thesis Commons, PeerJ, and multiple ArXiv repositories.

== See also ==
- List of metascience research centers and organisations
- List of preprint repositories
- Metascience
- Open science
- Replication crisis
