= SHERPA (organisation) =

UK information technology organisation

SHERPA (Securing a Hybrid Environment for Research Preservation and Access) is an organisation originally set up in 2002 to run and manage the SHERPA Project.

== History ==
SHERPA began as an endeavour to support the establishment of a number of open access institutional repositories based in UK universities. SHERPA, the organisation, is sometimes erroneously referred to as the SHERPA Project. SHERPA was founded in 2002 by Stephen Pinfield, who continued as its director until 2012. Throughout its life, SHERPA has been managed by Bill Hubbard, first as its manager then as director from 2012 onwards.

As well as a staff team based at Jisc (formerly the University of Nottingham), 33 research institutions and organisations comprised the SHERPA Partnership. The makeup of this partnership includes many, if not all, of the most research active institutions in the UK and provides practitioner-led experience to the project team.

In 2024 SHERPA services were replaced by the Jisc Open Policy Finder

== Awards ==
SHERPA's work in supporting open access and repositories on a national and international level was recognised in 2007 with the award of the SPARC Europe Award for Outstanding Achievements in Scholarly Communication.

== Current projects and services ==
SHERPA is involved as a full or advisory partner in a number of projects and services, which include:

- FACT — Funders & Authors Compliance Tool — helps authors comply with research funders' policies on open access to publications
- SHERPA/RoMEO|RoMEO – definitive listing of publishers' copyright agreements and retained author rights
- SHERPA/Juliet|Juliet – Research funders' archiving mandates and guidelines
- OpenDOAR - a directory of worldwide open access repositories

=== SHERPA/RoMEO ===
SHERPA/RoMEO is a service run by SHERPA to show the copyright and open access self-archiving policies of academic journals. RoMEO is an acronym for Rights MEtadata for Open archiving.

The database used a colour-coding scheme to classify publishers according to their self-archiving policy. This shows authors whether the journal allows preprint or postprint archiving in their copyright transfer agreements. It currently holds records for over 22,000 journals. The colour codes were retired in 2020, with the launch of a new site.

=== SHERPA/Juliet ===
SHERPA/Juliet is an online database of open access mandates adopted by academic funding bodies. It is part of the SHERPA suite of services around open access and is run by Jisc (formerly the University of Nottingham).

The database contains information about more than 100 funders, mostly from the United Kingdom. For each of them, Juliet indicates their policy regarding self-archiving, open access journals and archival of research data. Users can suggest updates to the records or the addition of a new funder via a form.

This service is mainly useful to researchers who have received project-based funding and want a clear summary of their funder. Links to the original policies are also provided.

== Completed projects ==
- Repositories Support Project (RSP) - support service for UK repository growth
- EThOS - developing a national eTheses service
- SHERPA Project - which helped develop archives in research-led institutions
- SHERPA Plus - expanding the repository network in the UK
- SHERPA DP - looking at preservation models
- PROSPERO - scoping an interim repository for UK academics
- the Depot – UK based interim repository (stemming from the PROSPERO project)
- DRIVER (Digital Repository Infrastructure Vision for European Research) - is developing a cross-European repository network infrastructure
- UKCoRR - United Kingdom Council of Research Repositories, professional organisation for UK Open Access repository administrators and managers. An output from SHERPA Plus.
