= PeerJ =

- Discipline: Biology, medicine
- Language: English
- Edited by: Jason Hoyt; Peter Binfield

Publication details
- History: 2013–present
- Publisher: PeerJ
- Frequency: Upon acceptance
- Open access: Yes
- License: CC BY
- Impact factor: 3.061 (2021)

Standard abbreviations
- ISO 4: PeerJ

Indexing
- ISSN: 2167-8359
- OCLC no.: 793828439

Links
- Journal homepage; Online access

PeerJ is both a for profit, open access, and peer-reviewed scientific mega journal covering research in the biological and medical sciences and the publisher of the journal itself (PeerJ Inc.). The journal officially launched in June 2012, started accepting submissions on December 3, 2012, and published its first articles on February 12, 2013.

In 2024, the firm was acquired by traditional research publisher Taylor & Francis.

PeerJ was originally published by a company of the same name that was co-founded by CEO Jason Hoyt (formerly at Mendeley) and publisher Peter Binfield (formerly at PLOS One), with initial financial backing of US$950,000 from O'Reilly Media's O'Reilly AlphaTech Ventures, and later funding from Sage Publishing.

The firm is a member of CrossRef, CLOCKSS, ORCID, and the Open Access Scholarly Publishers Association. The company's offices are in Corte Madera (California, USA), and London (England, UK). Submitted research is judged solely on scientific and methodological soundness (as at PLoS ONE), with a facility for peer reviews to be published alongside each paper.

== Business model ==
PeerJ uses a for profit business model that differs from traditional publishers – in that no subscription fees are charged to its readers – and initially differed from the major open-access publishers in that publication fees were not levied per article but per publishing researcher and at a much lower level. PeerJ also offered a preprint service named PeerJ Preprints (launched on April 3, 2013 and discontinued in September 2019). The low costs were said to be in part achieved by using cloud infrastructure: both PeerJ and PeerJ Preprints run on Amazon EC2, with the content stored on Amazon S3.

Originally, PeerJ charged a one-time membership fee to authors that allowed them—with some additional requirements, such as commenting upon, or reviewing, at least one paper per year—to publish in the journal for life.

Since October 2016, PeerJ has reverted to article processing charges, but still offers the lifetime membership subscription as an alternative option. The current charge for non-members publishing a single article in PeerJ is $1,195.00, regardless of the number of authors. Alternatively, the life-time membership permitting one free paper per year for life is $599 per author (basic membership), two per year for $699 (enhanced membership), or five per year for $799 (premium membership). It may sometimes be cheaper to pay the per publication charge than paying membership fees for all authors.

In May 2023, PeerJ introduced Annual Institutional Memberships as an alternative to article processing charges.

In 2024, PeerJ was acquired by traditional research publisher Taylor & Francis. The announcement suggests that Taylor & Francis will invest in PeerJ to support it to develop and innovate at greater scale.

== Reception ==
The journal is abstracted and indexed in Science Citation Index Expanded, PubMed, PubMed Central, Scopus, Web of Science, Google Scholar, the DOAJ, the American Chemical Society (ACS) databases, EMBASE, CAB Abstracts, Europe PubMed Central, AGORA, ARDI, HINARI, OARE, the ProQuest databases, and OCLC. According to the Journal Citation Reports, its impact factor increased from 2.118 in 2017 to 2.353 in 2018.

In April 2013 The Chronicle of Higher Education selected PeerJ CEO and co-founder Jason Hoyt as one of "Ten Top Tech Innovators" for the year.

On September 12, 2013 the Association of Learned and Professional Society Publishers awarded PeerJ the "Publishing Innovation" of the year award.

== Computer science and chemistry journals ==
On 3 February 2015, PeerJ launched a new journal dedicated to computer science: PeerJ Computer Science. The first article on PeerJ Computer Science was published on 27 May 2015.

On 6 November 2018, PeerJ launched five new journals dedicated to chemistry: PeerJ Physical Chemistry, PeerJ Organic Chemistry, PeerJ Inorganic Chemistry, PeerJ Analytical Chemistry, and PeerJ Materials Science.

== See also ==
- arXiv
- eLife
