= ChemRxiv =

Preprint server

- Website type: Science
- Available in: English
- Website: ChemRxiv.org
- Commercial: No
- Launched: 2017
- Current status: Online

ChemRxiv (pronounced "chem archive"—the X represents the Greek letter chi [χ]) is an open access preprint archive for chemistry. It is operated by the American Chemical Society, Royal Society of Chemistry and German Chemical Society. The new preprint server was announced already in 2016, but was only opened online in 2017. Initially, editors of ACS journals were skeptical and only 80% of the editors allowed submissions to be uploaded to the preprint server in 2017. In 2019 the Chinese Chemical Society and the Chemical Society of Japan joined as co-owners of the preprint server.

The initial reception of ChemRxiv was one of hesitation, with several major journals of the founding organizations initially unsupportive: Angewandte Chemie gave support in March 2018 and JACS only gave support in August 2018. However, ChemRxiv received more than 1,000 submissions in the first eighteen months, growing to 2,314 in 2019. Like other preprint servers, it saw a surge in COVID-19 preprints in 2020.

== See also ==
- List of preprint repositories
