= Self-archiving =

Authorial deposit of documents to provide open access

Typical publishing workflow for an academic journal article (preprint, postprint, and published) with open access sharing rights per SHERPA/RoMEO

Self-archiving is the act of (the author's) depositing a free copy of an electronic document online in order to provide open access to it. The term usually refers to the self-archiving of peer-reviewed research journal and conference articles, as well as theses and book chapters, deposited in the author's own institutional repository or open archive for the purpose of maximizing its accessibility, usage and citation impact. The term green open access has become common in recent years, distinguishing this approach from gold open access, where the journal itself makes the articles publicly available without charge to the reader.

== Origins ==
Self-archiving was first explicitly proposed as a universal practice by Stevan Harnad in his 1994 online posting "Subversive Proposal" (later published in Association of Research Libraries) although computer scientists had been practicing self-archiving in anonymous FTP archives since at least the 1980s (see CiteSeer) and physicists had been doing it since the early 1990s on the web (see arXiv).

The concept of green open access was coined in 2004 to describe a "mode of publishing in non open access journal but also self archiving it in an open access archive". Different drafts of a paper may be self-archived, such as the internal non-peer-reviewed version, or the peer-reviewed version published in a journal. Green open access through self-archiving was initially enabled through institutional or disciplinary repositories, as a growing number of universities adopted policies to encourage self-archiving. Self-archiving repositories do not peer-review articles, though they may hold copies of otherwise peer-reviewed articles. Self-archiving repositories also expect that the author who self-archives has the necessary rights to do so, as copyright may have been transferred to a publisher. Therefore it may only be possible to self-archive the preprint of the article.

== Implementation ==
Whereas the right to self-archive postprints is often a copyright matter (if the rights have been transferred to the publisher), the right to self-archive preprints is merely a question of journal policy.

A 2003 study by Elizabeth Gadd, Charles Oppenheim, and Steve Probets of the Department of Information Science at Loughborough University analysed 80 journal publishers' copyright agreements and found that 90 percent of publishers asked for some form of copyright transfer and only 42.5 percent allowed self-archiving in some form. In 2014 the SHERPA/Romeo project recorded that of 1,275 publishers 70 percent allowed for some form of self-archiving, with 62 percent allowing both pre and postprint self-archiving of published papers. In 2017 the project recorded that of 2,375 publishers 41 percent allowed pre and postprint to be self-archived. 33 percent only allowed the self-archiving of the postprint, meaning the final draft post-refereeing. 6 percent of publishers only allowed self-archiving of the preprint, meaning the pre-refereeing draft.

Publishers such as Cambridge University Press or the American Geophysical Union, endorse self-archiving of the final published version of the article, not just peer-reviewed final drafts.

Locations for self-archiving include institutional repositories, subject-based repositories, personal websites, and social networking websites that target researchers. Some publishers attempt to impose embargoes on self-archiving; embargo-lengths can be from 6–12 months or longer after the date of publication (see SHERPA/RoMEO). For embargoed deposits some institutional repositories have a request-a-copy Button with which users can request and authors can provide a single copy with one click each during the embargo.

Social reference management software websites such as Mendeley, Academia.edu, and ResearchGate facilitate sharing between researchers; however, these services are often subject to criticism for using scholars' contributions for commercial purposes as well as for copyright violation. They are also targeted by publishers for copyright compliance, such as when Elsevier (which purchased Mendeley) issued Digital Millennium Copyright Act takedown notices to Academia.edu for hosting scientific papers. Social networking services also do not fulfill the requirements of many self-archiving policies from grant funders, journals, and institutions.

In 2013 Germany created a legal basis for green open access by amending a secondary publication right into German copyright which gives scientists and researchers the legal right to self-archive their publications on the Internet, even if they have agreed to transfer all exploitation rights to a publisher. The secondary publication right applies to results of mainly publicly funded research, 12 months after the first publication. The right cannot be waived, and the author’s version is self-archived.

== See also ==
- Internet Archive
- Manuscript (publishing)
- Open access mandate
- Registry of Open Access Repositories (ROAR)
- Subversive Proposal
- List of academic journals by preprint policy
