= Institutional repository =

Archive of publications by an institution's staff

An institutional repository (IR) is an archive for collecting, preserving, and disseminating digital copies of the intellectual output of an institution, particularly a research institution. Academics also utilize their IRs for archiving published works to increase their visibility and collaboration with other academics. However, most of these outputs produced by universities are not effectively accessed and shared by researchers and other stakeholders. As a result academics should be involved in the implementation and development of an IR project so that they can learn the benefits and purpose of building an IR.

An institutional repository has been defined as "a set of services that a university offers to members of its community for the management and dissemination of digital materials created by the institution and its community members." For a university, this includes materials such as monographs, eprints of academic journal articles—both before (preprints) and after (postprints) undergoing peer review—as well as electronic theses and dissertations (ETDs). An institutional repository might also include other digital assets generated by academics, such as datasets, administrative documents, course notes, learning objects, academic posters or conference proceedings. Deposit of material in an institutional repository is sometimes mandated by an institution.

Some of the main objectives for having an institutional repository are to provide open access to institutional research output by self-archiving in an open access repository, to create global visibility for an institution's scholarly research, and to store and preserve other institutional digital assets, including less formally published grey literature such as theses, working papers or technical reports.

== Functions ==
Institutional repositories can be classified as a type of digital library. Institutional repositories perform the main functions of digital libraries by collecting, classifying, cataloging, curating, preserving, and providing access to digital content.

Institutional repositories enable researchers to self-archive their research output and can improve the visibility, usage and impact of research conducted at an institution. Other functions of an institutional repository include knowledge management, research assessment, and open access to scholarly research.

In 2003, the functions of an institutional repository were described by Clifford Lynch in relation to universities. He stated that:

"... a university-based institutional repository is a set of services that a university offers to the members of its community for the management and dissemination of digital materials created by the institution and its community members. It is most essentially an organizational commitment to the stewardship of these digital materials, including long-term preservation where appropriate, as well as organization and access or distribution."

The content of an institutional repository depends on the focus of the institution. Higher education institutions conduct research across multiple disciplines, thus research from a variety of academic subjects. Examples of such institutional repositories include the MIT Institutional Repository. A disciplinary repository is subject specific. It holds and provides access to scholarly research in a particular discipline. While there can be disciplinary repositories for one institution, disciplinary repositories are frequently not tied to a specific institution. The PsyDok disciplinary repository, for example, holds German-language research in psychology, while SSOAR is an international social science full-text server. Content included in an institutional repository can be both digitized and born-digital.

== Open-access repositories ==
Institutional repositories that provide access to research to users outside the institutional community are one of the recommended ways to achieve the open access vision described in the Budapest Open Access Initiative definition of open access. This is sometimes referred to as the self-archiving or "green" route to open access.

== Developing an institutional repository ==
Steps in the development of an institutional repository include choosing a platform and defining metadata practices. Designing an IR requires working with faculty to identify the type of content the library needs to support Marketing and promoting the Institutional repository is important to enhance access and increase the visibility of the researchers. Libraries will also need to target their marketing efforts to different groups of stakeholders. They may generate faculty interest by describing how an IR can support research or improve future findability of articles

== Software ==
Most institutional repository software platforms can use OAI-PMH to harvest metadata. For example, DSpace supports OAI-PMH.

A 2014 survey commissioned by Duraspace found that 72% of respondents indicated that their institutional repository is hosted by a third party.

== Aggregators ==
The Confederation of Open Access Repositories (COAR) states in its manifesto that "Each individual repository is of limited value for research: the real power of Open Access lies in the possibility of connecting and tying together repositories, which is why we need interoperability. In order to create a seamless layer of content through connected repositories from around the world, open access relies on interoperability, the ability for systems to communicate with each other and pass information back and forth in a usable format. Interoperability allows us to exploit today's computational power so that we can aggregate, data mine, create new tools and services, and generate new knowledge from repository content."

Interoperability is achieved in the world of institutional repositories by using protocols such as OAI-PMH. This allows search engines and open access aggregators, such as BASE, CORE and Unpaywall, to index repository metadata and content and provide value-added services on top of this content.

The Digital Commons Network aggregates by discipline some 500 institutional repositories running on the Bepress Digital Commons platform. It includes more than two million full-text objects.

== See also ==
- Digital Assets Repository – at Bibliotheca Alexandrina in Egypt
- Current research information system (CRIS)
- Category:Open-access archives
- Library publishing
- Registry of Open Access Repositories
- ResCarta Toolkit
- Scholarly commons
- CORE (research service)
