= Preprint =

Academic paper prior to journal publication

Typical publishing workflow for an academic journal article (preprint, postprint, and published) with open access sharing rights per SHERPA/RoMEO.

In academic publishing, a preprint is a version of a scholarly or scientific paper that precedes formal peer review and publication in a peer-reviewed scholarly or scientific journal. The preprint may be available, often as a non-typeset version available for free, before or after a paper is published in a journal.

== Role in research ==
=== Academic practices ===
Publication of manuscripts in a peer-reviewed journal often takes weeks, months or even years from the time of initial submission, owing to the time required by editors and reviewers to evaluate and critique manuscripts, and the time required by authors to address critiques. The need to quickly circulate current results within a scholarly community has led researchers to distribute documents known as preprints, which are manuscripts that have yet to undergo peer review. The immediate distribution of preprints allows authors to receive early feedback from their peers, which may be helpful in revising and preparing articles for submission. Preprint are also used to demonstrate the precedence of the discoveries and a way to protect the intellectual property (a prompt availability of the discovery can be used to block patenting or discourage competing parties).

Most publishers allow work to be published to preprint servers before submission. A minority of publishers decide on a case-by-case basis or interpret the Ingelfinger Rule to disqualify from submission. Yet, many journals prohibit or discourage the use of preprints in the references as they are not considered as credible sources.

Some journal-independent review services (Peerage of Science, Peer Community In, Review Commons, eLife Preprint Review) offer peer review on preprints. These peer-reviews are either a first step before publication in a journal (Peerage of Science, Review Commons, eLife Preprint Review) or result in a formal editorial decision (Peer Community In) without precluding submission in journals.

=== Stages of printing ===
While a preprint is an article that has not yet undergone peer review, a postprint is an article which has been peer reviewed in preparation for publication in a journal. Both the preprint and postprint may differ from the final published version of an article. Preprints and postprints together are referred to as e-prints or eprints.

The word reprint refers to hard copies of papers that have already been published; reprints can be produced by the journal publisher, but can also be generated from digital versions (for example, from an electronic database of peer-reviewed journals), or from eprints self-archived by their authors in their institutional repositories.

=== Tenure and promotion ===
In academia, preprints are not likely to be weighed heavily when a scholar is evaluated for tenure or promotion, unless the preprint becomes the basis for a peer-reviewed publication.

Some important results in mathematics have been published only on the preprint server arXiv. After nearly a century of effort by mathematicians, Grigori Perelman published a series of preprint papers on the arXiv between 2002 and 2003, in which he presented a proof of the Poincaré conjecture. He was offered both the $1 million Millennium Prize and the Fields Medal for the result, but he declined both prizes.

== Types of preprint servers ==
The preprint servers can be grouped in three categories: general (accepting practically all preprints, frequently with bias towards some topic, publisher e.g. Authorea), field-specific (e.g. bioRxiv, ChemRxiv) and regional (e.g. AfricArxiv, Arabixiv). Additionally, preprints can be categorised by the owner (private publishing company e.g. PeerJ PrePrints, libraries e.g. EarthArXiv, universities e.g. arXiv or independent non-profit organisations e.g. HAL). While many preprint servers appeared, some had been terminated. The canceled servers were operated mainly by profit publishing companies (e.g. Nature Publishing Group closed Nature Precedings or O'Reilly&SAGE closed PeerJ PrePrints) or were regional (e.g. INArxiv limited to Indonesia). Moreover, multiple writing platforms (e.g. Authorea) developed separate preprint servers as a part of their service. For more complete list (over 60 preprints servers) see: List of preprint repositories.

== History ==
Since 1991, preprints have increasingly been distributed electronically on the Internet, rather than as paper copies. This has given rise to massive preprint databases such as arXiv and HAL (open archive) etc. to institutional repositories. The sharing of preprints goes back to at least the 1960s, when the National Institutes of Health circulated biological preprints. After six years the use of these Information Exchange Groups was stopped, partially because journals stopped accepting submissions shared via these channels. In 2017, the Medical Research Council started supporting citations of preprints in grant and fellowship applications, and Wellcome Trust started accepting preprints in grant applications.

In February 2017, a coalition of scientists and biomedical funding bodies including the National Institutes of Health, the Medical Research Council and the Wellcome Trust launched a proposal for a central site for life-sciences preprints. In February 2017, SciELO announced plans to set up a preprints server – SciELO Preprints. In March 2017, the National Institutes for Health issued a new policy encouraging research preprint submissions. In April 2017, Center for Open Science announced that it will be launching six new preprint archives. At the end of the 2010s, libraries and discovery tools increasingly integrate Unpaywall data, which indexes millions of preprints and other green open access sources and manages to serve over half of the requests by users without the need for subscriptions.

During the early months of the COVID-19 pandemic, the need for published research on the disease spurred a wave of research articles being released as preprints, bypassing the peer-review and publication process, which was proving too slow in the context of an active and novel pandemic. The release of COVID-related preprint articles, along with other COVID-related articles published by traditional journals, contributed to the largest ever single-year increase in scholarly articles.

== See also ==
- Electronic article
- List of preprint repositories
- List of academic journals by preprint policy
- Offprint
- Prepress
- ScientificCommons
