= ArXiv =

Online archive of e-prints

arXiv

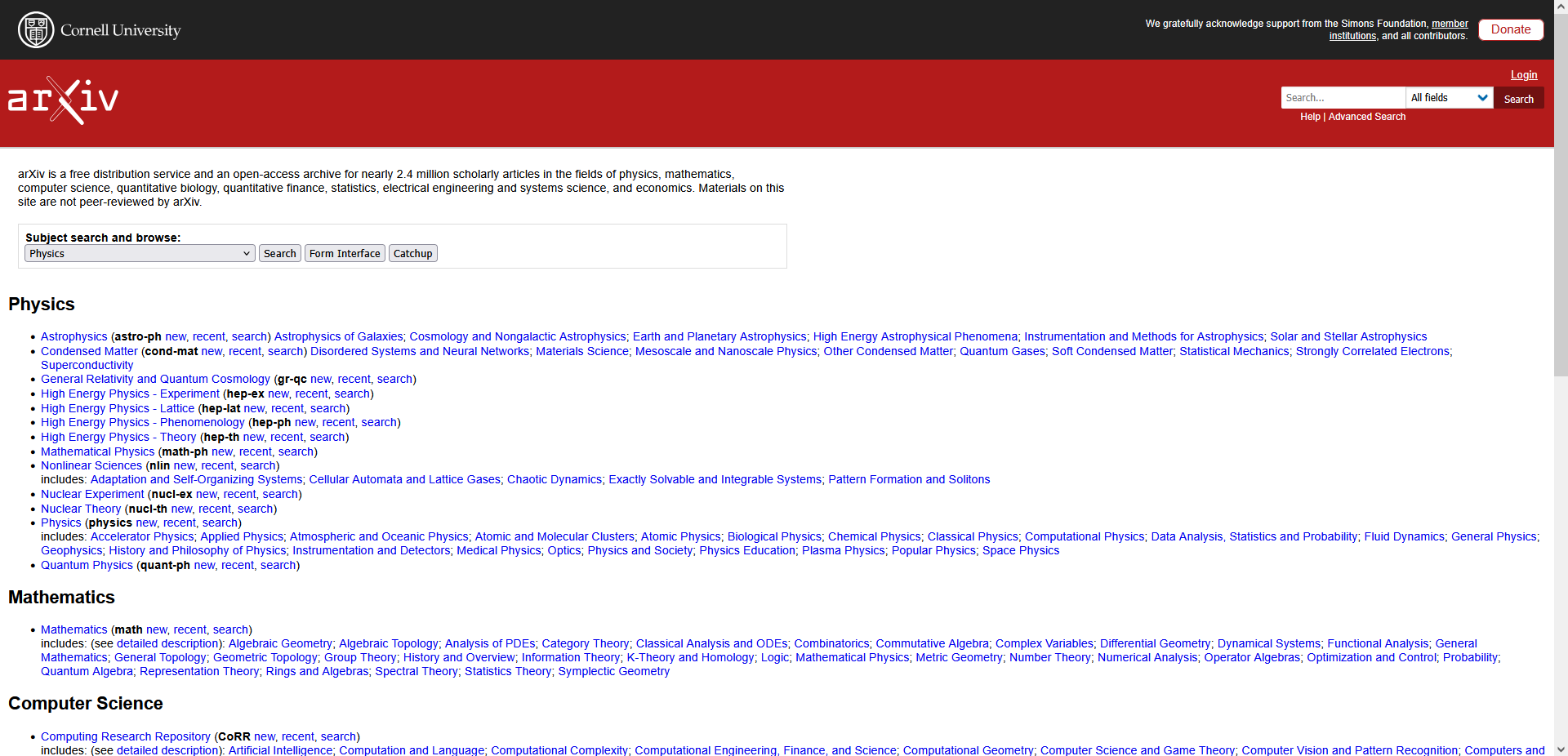
- Company type: Independent nonprofit organization
- Website type: Science
- Available in: English
- Founder: Paul Ginsparg
- Website: arxiv.org
- Commercial: No
- Launched: August 14, 1991; 35 years ago
- Current status: Online
- ISSN: 2331-8422
- OCLC number: 228652809

arXiv (pronounced as "archive"—the X represents the Greek letter chi ⟨χ⟩) is an independent, open-access repository of electronic preprints and postprints (known as e-prints) approved for posting after moderation, but not peer reviewed. It consists of scientific papers in the fields of mathematics, physics, astronomy, electrical engineering, computer science, quantitative biology, statistics, mathematical finance, and economics, which can be accessed online. In many fields of mathematics and physics, almost all scientific papers are self-archived on the arXiv repository before publication in a peer-reviewed journal. Some publishers also grant permission for authors to archive the peer-reviewed postprint. Begun on August 14, 1991, arxiv.org passed the half-million-article milestone on October 3, 2008. By the end of 2014, it had surpassed one million articles, and it reached two million by the end of 2021. As of October 2026, the submission rate is about 32,000 articles per month.

== History ==
A screenshot of the arXiv taken in 1994, using the browser NCSA Mosaic. At the time, HTML forms were a new technology.

arXiv's yearly submission rate growth over 30 years since its beginning with topics labeled by the standard abbreviations used on arxiv.org

arXiv was made possible by the compact TeX file format, which allowed scientific papers to be easily transmitted over the Internet and rendered client-side. Around 1990, Joanne Cohn began emailing physics preprints to colleagues as TeX files, but the number of papers being sent soon filled mailboxes to capacity. Paul Ginsparg recognized the need for central storage, and in August 1991 he created a central repository mailbox stored at the Los Alamos National Laboratory (LANL) that could be accessed from any computer. Additional modes of access were soon added: FTP in 1991, Gopher in 1992, and the World Wide Web in 1993. The term e-print was quickly adopted to describe the articles.

It began as a physics archive, called the LANL preprint archive, but soon expanded to include astronomy, mathematics, computer science, quantitative biology and, most recently, statistics. Its original domain name was xxx.lanl.gov. Due to LANL's lack of interest in the rapidly expanding technology, in 2001 Ginsparg changed institutions to Cornell University and changed the name of the repository to arxiv.org. Ginsparg brainstormed the new name with his wife; the domain "archive" was already claimed, so "chi" was replaced with "X" standing in as the Greek letter chi and the "e" dropped for symmetry around the "X".

arXiv was an early adopter and promoter of preprints. Its success in sharing preprints was one of the precipitating factors that led to the later movement in scientific publishing known as open access. Mathematicians and scientists regularly upload their papers to arxiv.org for worldwide access and sometimes for reviews before they are published in peer-reviewed journals. Ginsparg was awarded a MacArthur Fellowship in 2002 for his establishment of arXiv. The annual budget for arXiv was approximately $826,000 for 2013 to 2017, funded jointly by Cornell University Library, the Simons Foundation (in both gift and challenge grant forms) and annual fee income from member institutions. This model arose in 2010, when Cornell sought to broaden the financial funding of the project by asking institutions to make annual voluntary contributions based on the amount of download usage by each institution. Each member institution pledges a five-year funding commitment to support arXiv. Based on institutional usage ranking, the annual fees are set in four tiers from $1,000 to $4,400. Cornell's goal is to raise at least $504,000 per year through membership fees generated by approximately 220 institutions.

In September 2011, Cornell University Library took overall administrative and financial responsibility for arXiv's operation and development. Ginsparg was quoted in the Chronicle of Higher Education as joking that it "was supposed to be a three-hour tour, not a life sentence". However, Ginsparg remained on the arXiv's Scientific Advisory Board and its Physics Advisory Committee.

In January 2021, arXiv was declared as one of the "10 computer codes that transformed science" by the Nature journal. In January 2022, arXiv began assigning DOIs to articles, in collaboration with DataCite.

In March 2026, arXiv announced that it would separate itself from Cornell University and become an independent nonprofit organisation. The split, which occurred on July 1, 2026, was motivated by a desire to diversify and increase arXiv's funding.

In August, 2026, arXiv announced the appointment of its first CEO, Penelope Lewis, PhD., and an independent Board of Directors. Dr. Lewis previously served as Chief Publishing Officer at American Institute of Physics Publishing, and in various executive roles at the American Chemical Society.

== Data format ==
Each arXiv paper has a "uniquely specific identifier":

- YYMM.NNNNN, e.g. 1507.00123,
- YYMM.NNNN, e.g. 0704.0001,
- arch-ive/YYMMNNN for older papers, e.g. hep-th/9901001.

Different versions of the same paper are specified by a version number at the end. For example, 1709.08980v1. If no version number is specified, the default is the latest version.

arXiv uses a category system. Each paper is tagged with one or more categories. Some categories have two layers. For example, q-fin.TR is the "Trading and Market Microstructure" category within "quantitative finance". Other categories have one layer. For example, hep-ex is "high energy physics experiments".

== Moderation process and endorsement ==
Although arXiv is not peer reviewed, a collection of moderators for each area review the submissions; they may recategorize any that are deemed off-topic, or reject submissions that are not scientific papers, or sometimes for undisclosed reasons. The lists of moderators for many sections of arXiv are publicly available, but moderators for most of the physics sections remain unlisted. In addition to human moderators, all submissions are checked via an automated quality control process, ensuring a baseline standard of professionalism.

Additionally, an "endorsement" system was introduced in 2004 as part of an effort to ensure content is relevant and of interest to current research in the specified disciplines. Under the system, for categories that use it, an author must be endorsed by an established arXiv author before being allowed to submit papers to those categories. Endorsers are not asked to review the paper for errors but to check whether the paper is appropriate for the intended subject area. New authors from recognized academic institutions generally receive automatic endorsement, which in practice means that they do not need to deal with the endorsement system at all. However, the endorsement system has attracted criticism for allegedly restricting scientific inquiry.

A majority of the e-prints are also submitted to journals for publication, but some work, including some very influential papers, remain purely as e-prints and are never published in a peer-reviewed journal. A well-known example of the latter is an outline of a proof of Thurston's geometrization conjecture, including the Poincaré conjecture as a particular case, uploaded by Grigori Perelman in November 2002. Perelman appears content to forgo the traditional peer-reviewed journal process, stating: "If anybody is interested in my way of solving the problem, it's all there [on the arXiv] – let them go and read about it". Despite this non-traditional method of publication, other mathematicians recognized this work by offering the Fields Medal and Clay Mathematics Millennium Prizes to Perelman, both of which he refused.

While arXiv does contain some dubious e-prints, such as those claiming to refute famous theorems or proving famous conjectures such as Fermat's Last Theorem using only high-school mathematics, a 2002 article which appeared in Notices of the American Mathematical Society described those as "surprisingly rare". arXiv generally re-classifies these works, e.g. in "General mathematics", rather than deleting them; however, some authors have voiced concern over the lack of transparency in the arXiv screening process.

In November 2025, arXiv announced that it would no longer accept computer science review articles and position papers that had not been vetted by an academic journal or conference due to an increase in AI-generated research. arXiv stated that these sources "were never officially on arXiv's list of 'accepted content types'", and before submitting to arXiv, review articles and position papers should be accepted by a peer-reviewed journal or conference with reference and DOI metadata. However, arXiv does not accept articles from conference workshops, as they do not "meet the same standard of rigor of traditional peer review".

In May 2026, Thomas Dietterich, chair of arXiv's computer science section, set out in a series of posts on X that authors whose submissions contain what he called incontrovertible evidence of unchecked large language model output face a one-year submission ban, after which their next submission must first be accepted by a peer-reviewed venue before it can be posted.

=== Withdrawn preprints ===
It has been reported that 14,000 preprints have been withdrawn at arXiv, most commonly due to "crucial errors". A lesser number of the withdrawals were due to the preprint being subsumed by another publication. The report itself was posted at arXiv December, 2024.

== Submission formats ==
Papers can be submitted in any of several formats, including LaTeX, and PDF printed from a word processor other than TeX or LaTeX. The submission is rejected by the arXiv software if generating the final PDF file fails, if any image file is too large, or if the total size of the submission is too large. arXiv now allows one to store and modify an incomplete submission, and only finalize the submission when ready. The time stamp on the article is set when the submission is finalized.

== Access ==
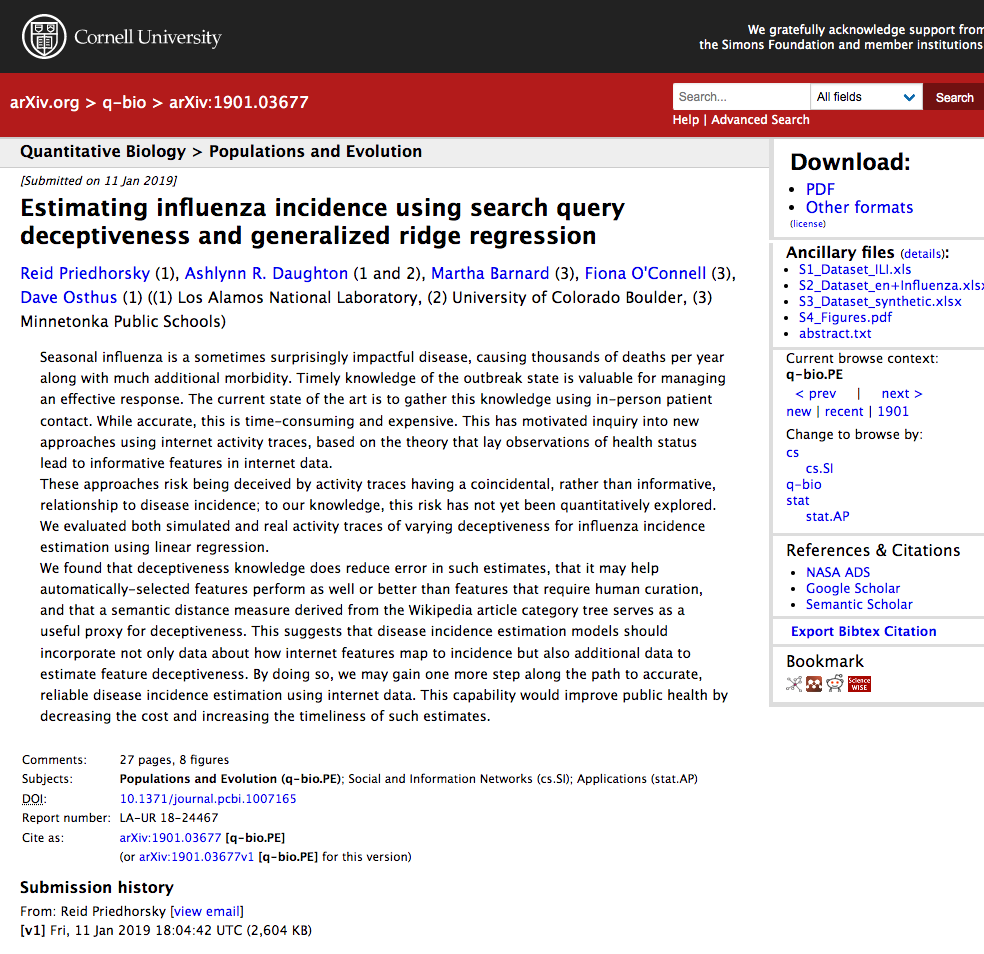
A screenshot of viewing a paper's abstract on arxiv.org in 2021

The standard access route is through the arxiv.org website, which is publicly accessible and does not require an account. Other interfaces and access routes have also been created by other un-associated organisations.

Metadata for arXiv is made available through OAI-PMH, the standard for open access repositories. Content is therefore indexed in all major consumers of such data, such as BASE, CORE and Unpaywall. As of 2020, the Unpaywall dump links over 500,000 arXiv URLs as the open access version of a work found in CrossRef data from the publishers, making arXiv a top 10 global host of green open access.

Finally, researchers can select sub-fields and receive daily e-mailings or RSS feeds of all submissions in them.

== Copyright status of files ==
Files on arXiv can have a number of different copyright statuses:

1. Some are public domain, in which case they will have a statement saying so.
2. Some are available under either the Creative Commons 4.0 Attribution-ShareAlike license or the Creative Commons 4.0 Attribution-Noncommercial-ShareAlike license.
3. Some are copyright to the publisher, but the author has the right to distribute them and has given arXiv a non-exclusive irrevocable license to distribute them.
4. Most are copyright to the author, and arXiv has only a non-exclusive irrevocable license to distribute them.

== See also ==
- List of preprint repositories

== General and cited sources ==
- Butler, Declan (2003). "Biologists Join Physics Preprint Club". Nature. 425 (6958): 548. Bibcode:2003Natur.425..548B. doi:10.1038/425548b. PMID 14534551. S2CID 4374168.
- Choi, Charles Q. (2003). "Biology's New Online Archive". The Scientist. Archived from the original on March 13, 2005.
- Giles, Jim (2003). "Preprint Server Seeks Way to Halt Plagiarists". Nature. 426 (6962): 7. Bibcode:2003Natur.426Q...7G. doi:10.1038/426007a. PMID 14603280. S2CID 29003994.
- Ginsparg, Paul (1997). "Winners and Losers in the Global Research Village". The Serials Librarian. 30 (3–4): 83–95. doi:10.1300/J123v30n03_13.
- Halpern, Joseph Y. (1998). "A Computing Research Repository". D-Lib Magazine. 4 (11). doi:10.1045/november98-halpern.
- Halpern, Joseph Y. (2000). "CoRR: A computing research repository". ACM Journal of Computer Documentation. 24 (2): 41–48. arXiv:cs.DL/0005003. Bibcode:2000cs........5003H. doi:10.1145/337271.337274. S2CID 5453868.
- Luce, Richard E. (2001). "e-Prints Intersect the Digital Library: Inside the los Alamos arXiv". Issues in Science and Technology Librarianship (29). doi:10.5062/F44B2Z95.
- McKiernan, Gerry (2000). "ArXiv.org: The los Alamos National Laboratory e-print server" (PDF). International Journal on Grey Literature. 1 (3): 127–138. doi:10.1108/14666180010345564. Archived from the original (PDF) on May 5, 2005.
- Pinfield, Stephen (2001). "How Do Physicists Use an E-Print Archive? Implications for Institutional E-Print Services". D-Lib Magazine. 7 (12). doi:10.1045/december2001-pinfield.
- Quigley, Brian (2000). "Physics Databases and the Los Alamos e-Print Archive". EContent. 23 (5): 22–26.
- Taubes, Gary (1993). "Publication by Electronic Mail Takes Physics by Storm". Science. 259 (5099): 1246–1248. Bibcode:1993Sci...259.1246T. doi:10.1126/science.259.5099.1246. PMID 17732237.
- Warner, Simeon (2001). "Open Archives Initiative protocol development and implementation at arXiv". arXiv:cs/0101027.
- "What Is q-bio?". Open Access Now. 2004.
