= Disciplinary repository =

Online archive for a specific subject

A disciplinary repository (or subject repository) is an online archive, often an open-access repository, containing works or data associated with these works of scholars in a particular subject area. Disciplinary repositories can accept work from scholars from any institution. A disciplinary repository shares the roles of collecting, disseminating, and archiving work with other repositories, but is focused on a particular subject area. These collections can include academic and research papers.

Disciplinary repositories can acquire their content in many ways. Many rely on author or organization submissions, such as SSRN. Others such as CiteSeerX crawl the web for scholar and researcher websites and download publicly available academic papers from those sites. AgEcon, established in 1995, grew as a result of active involvement of academia and societies.

A disciplinary repository generally covers one broad based discipline, with contributors from many different institutions supported by a variety of funders; the repositories themselves are likely to be funded from one or more sources within the subject community. Deposit of material in a disciplinary repository is sometimes mandated by research funders.

Disciplinary repositories can also act as stores of data related to a particular subject, allowing documents along with data associated with that work to be stored in the repository.

What was believed to be the first public Workshop on Disciplinary Repositories was held on June 16 and 17, 2011, at the ACM Joint Conference on Digital Libraries in Ottawa, Ontario, Canada.

== Importance ==
Beyond the core functions of collecting, disseminating, and archiving scholarly works, disciplinary repositories offer significant benefits to the overall academic ecosystem. Here is a closer look at their contributions:

- Increased accessibility: Many research articles are published in pay-walled journals, hindering access for new researchers. Disciplinary repositories make these publications more readily available at no cost, fostering wider dissemination of knowledge.
- Enhanced discoverability: By categorizing scholarly works by subject area, disciplinary repositories enable researchers to locate relevant studies quickly and efficiently. This targeted organization streamlines the research process.
- Improved credibility: Several disciplinary repositories implement a pre-print quality control process. This initial vetting enhances the overall credibility of the hosted research materials.
- Preservation: Disciplinary repositories serve as digital archives, safeguarding valuable research from loss or degradation.
- Scholarly impact measurement: Citation data associated with publications within disciplinary repositories can be used to evaluate research impact and the contribution of individual studies to a particular field.

In conclusion, disciplinary repositories play a vital role in promoting research, scholarship, and knowledge development across academic disciplines.

== See also ==
- Institutional repository
