= Open access in Australia =

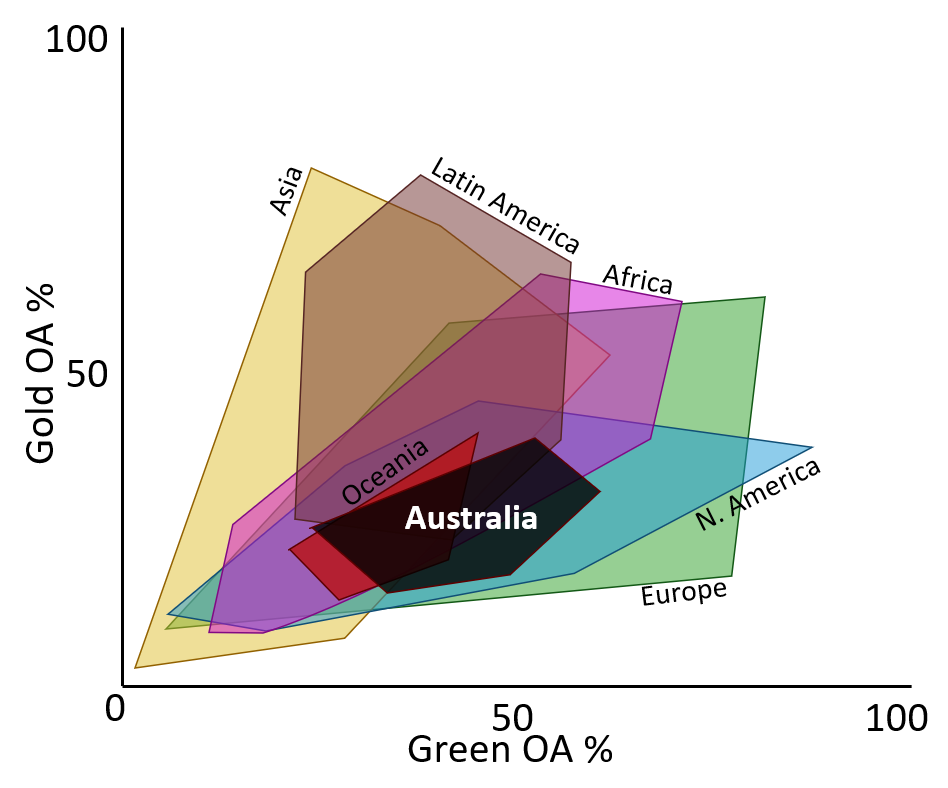
Gold OA vs green OA by institution for 2017 with Australia highlighted. Note: articles may be both green and gold OA so x and y values do not sum to total OA (animated version 2007-2018).

Open access (OA) to academic publications has seen extensive growth in Australia since the first open access university repository was established in 2001 and OA is a fundamental part of the scholarly publishing and research landscape in Australia. There are open access policies at the two major research funders: The National Health and Medical Research Council (NHMRC) and Australian Research Council (ARC) and around half of Australian Universities have an OA policy or statement. Open Access Australasia (formerly The Australasian Open Access Strategy Group), the Council of Australian University Librarians (CAUL), and the Australian Library and Information Association (ALIA) are advocates for Open Access and related issues in Australia.

== History ==
Timeline of key events

2001: ANU became Australia's first university to establish an open repository for ePrints.

2003: QUT was the first university in the world to mandate open access for all of its scholarly works.

2010: CAUL released a Statement on Open Scholarship and the Australian Government made a Declaration of Open Government.

2012: The NHMRC's Open Access Policy took effect.

2013: The ARC's OA policy took effect making all ARC Discovery projects from 2014 comply.

2014: ALIA adopted a full open access policy.

2016: The Australian Productivity Commission report on the Intellectual Property system recommended that all federal, state and territory governments "implement an open access policy for publicly-funded research".

2017: A joint policy statement recommending making Australia's publicly funded research outputs F.A.I.R. OA was endorsed by ALIA, APO, Open Data Institute, Creative Commons Australia, CAUL, National and State Libraries Australia, Knowledge Unlatched & Australasian Research Management Society.

2022: NHMRC updated its OA policy to require immediate OA.

Overview of open access in Australia (2001-2021)

Australian institutions were involved in some of the early developments in the Open Access movement, including the first university to mandate open access to its research outputs in 2003. In 2006 the Australian government signed the OECD Recommendation on Access to Research Data from Public Funding when it was first adopted by the OECD Council and have resigned the updated recommendation issued in 2021. Australian research funding agencies introduced open access policies in 2013–14, however caveats in these policies led to low effect as they were not monitored or mandatory. As of 2020, Australian institutions lag behind those of other countries, especially Europe and Latin America.

A significant change occurred in 2021, when the NHMRC announced a draft update to its OA policy that would remove previous caveats and mandate that all funded research outputs be made OA under a creative commons license without embargo. This was done in response to the Plan S recommendations developed by an international coalition of research funders. The Chief Scientist also announced her intent to establish a national set of OA agreements with publishers, building on earlier transformative agreements negotiated by CAUL.

== Advocacy ==
Various organisations and interest groups are engaged in advocating for greater access to research publications, data and other outputs in Australia. Campaigns have focused on developing and implementing changes to education and research policy, practice and infrastructure across higher education, government, civil society and commercial sectors. The Australian Open Access Strategies Group (AOASG) (now known as Open Access Australasia) was established in 2013 as a membership-based organisation supported by a number of Australian universities to promote OA and the F.A.I.R principles. It provides strategic advocacy and operational support to universities, research institutes, funders and government organisations. It is currently hosted by UNSW and based at Queensland University of Technology.

Many libraries and library associations in Australia have taken a strong advocacy role in promoting open access to academic research including The Council of Australian University Librarians (CAUL) and the Australian Library and Information Association (ALIA). In 2019 CAUL published a 'Statement on Open Scholarship' calling for clear policies and specific practices to ensure open access to data, publications and educational resources. Many Australian university libraries participate in Open Access Week, a global program of events held annually in October to promote the transition to open access.

== Publishing and hosting ==
As of 2021, 117 open access journals were published in Australia according to DOAJ. These are published by a mixture of Australian-based publishers as well as international publishing houses. Similarly, there are 75 open repositories hosted in Australia as of 2021 according to ROAR.

== Policies ==
The most influential OA policies in Australia are those set by governmental research funders (the ARC, NHMRC, and MRFF) as well as individual universities and other research institutions. These policies vary widely, and are collated in a directory by Open Access Australasia. In 2022 the NHMRC updated its OA policy to require immediate OA with a CC-BY licence. The NHMRC also announced it was joining cOAlition S. The Australian government has also endorsed various recommendations on open access to information, data and publications including the OECD Recommendation on Access to Research Data from Public Funding in 2021. In 2021
