= Open access in New Zealand =

Open access in New Zealand consists of policies and norms affecting making research outputs, data, and education materials openly available. This is influenced by tertiary education institutions as well as national government and changing international norms. The New Zealand Government has applied open access principles to its own work, adopting the New Zealand Government Open Access Licensing Framework (NZGOAL). It has not mandated that these apply to schools or the tertiary sector or to research funding agencies. Some tertiary education institutions have developed their own open access guidelines or policies but neither of the two major research funding agencies in New Zealand—the Marsden Fund and the Health Research Council—have done so, unlike Australia, Canada, Europe or the United States.

== New Zealand Government and open access ==
In 2010 the New Zealand Government adopted NZGOAL or the New Zealand Government Open Access Licensing Framework to provide "...guidance for agencies to follow when releasing copyright works and non-copyright material for re-use by others." The stated purpose of the framework is to unlock for reuse the large amounts of material generated by government agencies, since it is "widely recognised, in New Zealand and abroad, that significant creative and economic potential may lie dormant in such material when locked up in agencies and not released on terms allowing re-use by others." Essentially NZGOAL required government agencies to adopt a Creative Commons licence to data or information released with a high potential for public reuse. Version 2 of NZGOAL was finalised in December 2014. The framework has also had a software extension released to "let kiwi techies use government software to help build other innovative software".

A corollary government instrument was the Declaration on Open and Transparent Government in 2011, which sought "to commit to releasing high value public data actively for re-use, in accordance with the Declaration and Principles, and in accordance with the NZGOAL Review and Release process."

Version 1 of NZGOAL applied to all State Sector agencies, including the Public Service and Crown Entities but this specifically excluded tertiary education institutions. For Version 2 of NZGOAL, this wording was altered, with Public Service departments being directed to use NZGOAL, while other State Services were strongly encouraged to adopt it; school boards of were to be "invited" to do so.

== Formal open access policies in the tertiary sector ==
In 2010 The Council of New Zealand University Librarians (CONZUL)—a Committee of Universities New Zealand—released a Statement on Open Scholarship, updated in 2019.

In 2013 a group of researchers, lawyers, librarians, research infrastructure providers, technology consultants, and software developers met at an open research conference formulating the 'Tasman Declaration' on open research, with the vision that "society [should be] able to access and reuse the outputs of publicly funded research for economic, societal, and environmental benefit." There were around 50 signatories to the Declaration, including those at the event and some who put their name to it after the conference itself. However, the Declaration has not made an impact on the open access landscape in New Zealand.

Subsequently, individual educational institutions have adopted their own open access policies, all following the self-archiving or so-called 'Green' open access model where staff are encouraged to deposit versions of their work in institutional repositories. Open Access Australasia maintains lists of institutional policies.

- Auckland University of Technology
- Lincoln University
- University of Auckland
- University of Canterbury
- University of Otago
- University of Waikato
- Victoria University of Wellington

== Open research repositories and journals ==
Open Access Australasia maintains lists of institutional research repositories and open access journals hosted by New Zealand institutions.

== Open Educational Resources ==
Open Educational Resources (OERs) have been slow to gain widespread adoption as teaching materials in New Zealand. There has been a lack of national or agency-driven strategy, as there has been in countries like Canada, though there have been a number of institutional or individual developments.

In 2022 the Council of Australian University Librarians announced the Open Educational Resources Collective, designed to foster the adaptation or creation of OERs in participating institutions, with a particular focus on resources focused on Australia and New Zealand.

== Open access in the galleries, libraries, archives and museums sector ==
OpenGLAM is a movement that was born out of the free culture movement. It promotes the freedom to distribute and modify creative works through free content. The New Zealand Electronic Text Centre was the first organisation to adopt OpenGLAM in 2008. Other institutions that have opened up their images, data and other content include The Museum of New Zealand Te Papa Tongarewa, the National Library of New Zealand, Auckland War Memorial Museum, Upper Hutt City Library and Auckland Libraries.

== Creative Commons licences ==
Adoption of Creative Commons licences for use with open access materials New Zealand has followed similar patterns to other parts of the world and a New Zealand-specific version of the licence was adopted with version 3.0. With version 4.0 of the international licence New Zealand was the first to translate the English language licence into an indigenous language, the Māori language Te Reo Māori.

== See also ==
- Open access in Canada
- Open data in Canada
- Open educational practices in Australia
