= UNZA Institutional repository =

An institutional repository (IR) is simply a "digital archive of the intellectual products created by faculty research staff and students of an institution and accessible to end users both within and outside of the institution, with few if any barriers to access”. To enhance optimization and accessibility of the content in the IR, open access repositories are registered with the Directory of Open Access Repositories (OpenDOAR) which basically is a list of open academic repositories. Many universities have established IRs to promote open access to knowledge and information. The University of Zambia Institutional Repository (UNZA-IR) was established in 2010 with the support of the Netherlands Government to help archive the intellectual output of the university. The repository falls under the UNZA main Library and is headed by the repository manager who oversees the operations of the repository. The UNZA repository was created using Dspace, an "open source repository software package used for creating open access repositories.

The UNZA repository houses research outputs including: post graduate research dissertations and thesis, research reports, conference presentations, book chapters and research articles (pre-prints and post prints). Currently, the repository houses approximately more than 8000 research publications with post graduate desertions and thesis being most collected.

Content in the UNZA IR is organised according to communities of users or depositors. Since users of an institutional repository come from within a research community or organisation. Much of the content in the UNZA repository is deposited by students and academic members staff from the various schools and departments. However, the content is publicly available to users outside the university.

Users can browse and search for content using the search bar or by following a specific community that they might be interested in.

Communities in the UNZA IR:

The UNZA IR has about 20 communities and these include:

- Agricultural Sciences
- Education
- Engineering
- Examination Past Papers
- Graduate School of Business
- Humanities and Social Sciences
- Institute of Distance Education
- Institute of Economic and Social Research (INESOR)
- Law
- Library
- Medicine
- Mines
- Natural Sciences
- Students' Project/Research Reports
- Technical Development and Advisory Unit (TDAU)
- Theses and Dissertations
- University Collection
- University of Zambia Press (UNZA Press)
- Veterinary Medicine
