= Open access in Sweden =

Open access to scholarly communication in Sweden is relatively widespread. In 2010 the Swedish Research Council began requiring its grantees to make research results available in open access form. Lund University Libraries and Stockholm University Press belong to the international Open Access Scholarly Publishers Association.

Content in academic repositories can be found by searching SwePub.

== Repositories ==
There are a number of collections of scholarship in Sweden housed in digital open access repositories. They contain journal articles, book chapters, data, and other research outputs that are free to read. Swepub is the national database for scholarly publications in Sweden. Swepub aggregate scholarly output from a number of sources. One of the sources is the Diva-portal.org platform.

== Timeline ==
Key events in the development of open access in Sweden include the following:

- 2001
  - May: Swedish Wikipedia begins publication.
  - October: Susning.nu Swedish language wiki begins publication.
- 2008
  - February: Swedish University of Agricultural Sciences begins policy encouraging deposits in its institutional repository.
- 2011
  - March: Malmö University begins requiring deposits in its institutional repository.
- 2016
  - November: the Swedish Research Bill establishes that the National Library is responsible for activities concerning open access to scientific publications and that the Swedish Research Council is responsible for work on open access to research data. The two institutions must act in consultation with each other and with other bodies involved.

== See also ==
- Internet in Sweden
- Education in Sweden
- Media of Sweden
- Open access in other countries
- People of Sweden
- Languages of Sweden
