= Tri-Agency Open Access Policy on Publications =

Canada introduced the Tri-Agency Open Access Policy on Publications in May 2015 to mandate open access to research articles funded by Canada's three major research agencies: the Natural Sciences and Engineering Research Council (NSERC), the Social Sciences and Humanities Research Council (SSHRC) and the Canadian Institutes of Health Research (CIHR). CIHR has had an open access policy since 2008 and the new Tri-Agency policy is largely based on CIHR's pre-existing policy.

The policy stipulates that peer-reviewed journal articles produced from funded research must be made open access within 12 months of publication by either:

- publication in an open access journal
- archiving in a subject repository or institutional repository

== Applicability ==
The policy affects Tri-Agency grants awarded on or after May 1, 2015. All funded researchers are affected except graduate students and postdoctoral fellows. Only peer-reviewed journal articles are covered by the policy: other research outputs such as books or media, are not affected. Only postprints or final published articles may be archived in a subject or institutional repository; other article versions, e.g. preprints, are not acceptable.

== Compliance ==
Enforcement of the Tri-Agency policy has not been explicitly described. Compliance with the CIHR open access policy has been managed in conjunction with the Research Reporting Service.
