= Library publishing =

Library-provided publishing services

Library publishing, also known as campus-based publishing, is the practice of an academic or public library providing publishing services.

== Concept ==
A library publishing service usually publishes academic journals and often provides a broader range of publishing services as well. This can include publishing other formats such as scholarly monographs and conference proceedings. It generally has a preference for open access publishing.

Library publishing often focuses on electronic publishing rather than print, thus complementing the role of traditional academic presses. Sometimes a library and a university press based at the same institution will form a partnership, with each focusing on their own area of expertise. For example, the University of Pittsburgh library publishing service publishes peer-reviewed journals and also collaborates with the university press to publish open access monographs.

Software is available to manage the journal publication process. The open source Open Journal Systems by the Public Knowledge Project, and Digital Commons' bepress, are both widely used by library publishing services. Some libraries use Open Journal Systems to create overlay journals which present scholarly content that is held in an institutional repository.

== History ==
Library publishing has a long history and has been around since before the Internet.

In 1990, academic libraries published two of the first scholarly electronic journals on the Internet. The University of Houston Libraries began publishing The Public-Access Computer Systems Review and the Virginia Tech University Libraries began publishing the Journal of the International Academy of Hospitality Research.

The Synergies project (2007–2011) was a collaboration between different Canadian universities to create infrastructure to support institutional publishing activities. A survey conducted by Hahn in 2008 found that at that time 65% of research libraries in North America either had a library publishing service or were considering creating one.

In 2011 in the UK, Jisc funded three library publishing projects: Huddersfield Open Access Publishing (HOAP) at the University of Huddersfield, SAS Open Journals at the University of London, and EPICURE at UCL.

The Library Publishing Coalition was launched in 2013 to provide a hub for library publishing activities. In October 2013, during Open Access Week, they launched a Library Publishing Directory which contains information about library publishing activities at 115 academic and research libraries.

== See also ==
- Category:Academic journals published by university libraries
- Category:Library publishing
- Scholarly commons
- University press
