= Open access in the Republic of Ireland =

Overview of the culture and regulation of open access in Ireland

== Repositories ==
There are a number of collections of scholarship in Ireland housed in digital open access repositories. They contain journal articles, book chapters, data, and other research outputs that are free to read.

== See also ==
- Internet in the Republic of Ireland
- Education in the Republic of Ireland
- Media of Ireland
- Open access in other countries
