= Open-access repository =

Open-access research database

An open repository or open-access repository is a digital platform that holds research output and provides free, immediate and permanent access to research results for anyone to use, download and distribute. To facilitate open access such repositories must be interoperable according to the Open Archives Initiative Protocol for Metadata Harvesting (OAI-PMH). Search engines harvest the content of open access repositories, constructing a database of worldwide, free of charge available research. Data repositories are the cornerstone for FAIR (findable, accessible, interoperable and reusable) data practices and are used expeditiously within the scientific community.

Open-access repositories, such as an institutional repository or disciplinary repository, provide free access to research for users outside the institutional community and are one of the recommended ways to achieve the open access vision described in the Budapest Open Access Initiative definition of open access. This is sometimes referred to as the self-archiving or "green" route to open access.

== Benefits ==
The benefits of open-access repositories are:

- Opening up outputs of the institution to a worldwide audience;
- Maximizing the visibility and impact of these outputs as a result;
- Showcasing the institution to interested constituencies – prospective staff, prospective students and other stakeholders;
- Collecting and curating digital output;
- Managing and measuring research and teaching activities;
- Providing a workspace for work-in-progress, and for collaborative or large-scale projects;
- Enabling and encouraging interdisciplinary approaches to research;
- Facilitating the development and sharing of digital teaching materials and aids, and
- Supporting student endeavours, providing access to theses and dissertations and a location for the development of e-portfolios.

== Software ==
The most frequently used repository software for open repositories according to OpenDOAR are Digital Commons, DSpace and EPrints. Other examples are arXiv, bioRxiv, Dryad, Figshare, Open Science Framework, Samvera, Ubiquity Repositories and invenio (solution used by Zenodo).

== See also ==
- Current research information system
- Digital library
- Digital asset management
- Library publishing
- Open-access archives
- Open access around the world
- List of academic databases and search engines
- ROARMAP
