= Open-access mandate =

Policy requiring or recommending Open Access to scientific publications

An open-access mandate is a policy adopted by a research institution, research funder, or government which requires or recommends researchers—usually university faculty or research staff and/or research grant recipients—to make their published, peer-reviewed journal articles and conference papers open access (1) by self-archiving their final, peer-reviewed drafts in a freely accessible institutional repository or disciplinary repository ("Green OA") or (2) by publishing them in an open-access journal ("Gold OA") or both.

== Characteristics ==
Among the universities that have adopted open-access mandates for faculty are Harvard University, Massachusetts Institute of Technology, University College London, Queensland University of Technology, University of Minho (Portugal), University of Liège and ETH Zürich. Among the funding organizations that have adopted open-access mandates for grant recipients are National Institutes of Health (with the NIH Public Access Policy), Research Councils UK, National Fund for Scientific Research, Wellcome Trust and European Research Council. For a full index of institutional and funder open-access mandates adopted to date, see the Registry of Open Access Mandatory Archiving Policies (ROARMAP).

Open-access mandates can be classified in many ways: by the type of mandating organization (employing institution or research funder), by the locus (institutional or institution-external) and timing of deposit itself (immediate, delayed), by the time (immediate, delayed) at which the deposit is made open access, and by whether or not there is a default copyright-retention contract (and whether it can be waived). Mandate types can also be compared for strength and effectiveness (in terms of the annual volume, proportion and timing of deposits, relative to total annual article output, as well as the time that access to the deposit is set as open access. Mandates are classified and ranked by some of these properties in MELIBEA.

=== Institutional and funder mandates ===
Universities can adopt open-access mandates for their faculty. All such mandates make allowances for special cases. Tenured faculty cannot be required to publish; nor can they be required to make their publications open access. However, mandates can take the form of administrative procedures, such as designating repository deposit as the official means of submitting publications for institutional research performance review, or for research grant applications or renewal. Many European university mandates have taken the form of administrative requirements, whereas many U.S. university mandates have taken the form of a unanimous or near-unanimous self-imposed faculty consensus consisting of a default rights-retention contract (together with a waiver option for individual special cases).

Research funders such as government funding agencies or private foundations can adopt open-access mandates as contractual conditions for receiving funding.

New open-access mandates are often announced during the annual Open Access Week, that takes place globally during the last full week of October. For example, the Royal Society chose Open Access Week 2011 to announce the release of the digitized backfiles of their archives, dating from 1665 to 1941.

=== Principal kinds of open-access mandates ===
"Mandate" can mean either "authorize" or "oblige". Both senses are important in inducing researchers to provide OA. Open-access advocate Peter Suber has remarked that "'mandate' is not a good word..." for open-access policies, "...but neither is any other English word." Other ways to describe a mandate include "shifting the default publishing practice to open access" in the case of university faculty or "putting an open-access condition" on grant recipients. Mandates are stronger than policies which either request or encourage open access, because they require that authors provide open access. Some mandates allow the author to opt out if they give reasons for doing so.

- Encouragement policies - These are not requirements but merely recommendations to provide open access.
- Loophole mandates - These require authors to provide open access if and when their publishers allow it.

Mandates may include the following clauses:

- Mandates with a limited-embargo clause - These require authors to provide open access either immediately or, at the latest, after a maximal permissible embargo period (which may vary from 6 months to 12 months or more).
- Mandates with an immediate-deposit clause - These require authors to deposit their refereed final drafts in their institutional repository immediately upon publication (or upon acceptance for publication) whether or not their publishing contracts allow making the deposit open access immediately: If the publisher embargoes open access, access to the deposit can be left as closed access during any permissible embargo period. (For closed-access deposits repositories have a request-a-copy Button with which users can request and authors can provide a single copy with one click each during the embargo.)
- Mandates with a rights-retention clause - These policies typically extend to the parent institution a non-exclusive license to exercise any and all copyrights in the article. Copyright remains with the author until they transfer copyright to a publisher, at which point the non-exclusive license survives. In so doing, authors are free to publish wherever they prefer, while granting the institution the right to post a version of the article on the open web via an institutional repository. The benefit of the rights-retention clause is that neither the author, nor the institution, need negotiate open access with the publisher; the policy itself allows open access to the article. Upon acceptance or publication, the author or their representative deposits the article into their institutional repository. Waivers are generally available in cases where authors do not desire open access for a given article. Examples include Europe's Plan S and policies of Harvard University and the Wellcome Trust.

=== Locus of deposit ===
Most institutional open-access mandates require that authors self archive their papers in their own institutional repository. Some funder mandates specify institutional deposit, some specify institution-external deposit, and some allow either.

=== Timing of deposit ===
Mandates may require deposit immediately upon publication (or acceptance for publication) or after an allowable embargo.

=== Timing of opening access to deposit ===
Mandates may require opening access to the deposit immediately upon publication (or acceptance for publication) or after an allowable embargo.

== Instances ==
=== Canadian funding agencies ===
The Canadian Institutes of Health Research (CIHR) proposed a mandate in 2006 and adopted it in September 2007, becoming the first North American public research funder to do so. The CIHR Policy on Access to Research Outputs provides two options to researchers: publication in open access journals, and making their manuscripts available in an online central (PubMed Central Canada is recommended) or institutional repository.

In October 2013, the two other Canadian federal funding agencies, the National Science and Engineering Council (NSERC) and the Social Science and Humanities Research Council (SSHRC) jointly proposed the same mandate as CIHR's, and launched a two-month consultation on what will become the Tri-Agency Open Access Policy.

On 27 February 2015 a Tri-Agency Open Access Policy on Publications was announced. Peer-reviewed journal publications arising from Agency-supported research must be made freely available within 12 months of publication, whether by depositing in an online repository or by publishing in a journal that offers immediate or delayed open access. The policy is effective for grants awarded from 1 May 2015 onward.

On 1 May 2015 the International Development Research Centre adopted a new open access policy. Books and journal articles must be made freely available within 12 months of publication, whether by publishing open access and using open access journals, or by uploading to an open access repository. The policy is effective for proposals received on or after 20 July 2015.

=== United States funding agencies ===
In May 2006, the US Federal Research Public Access Act (FRPAA) was proposed toward improving the NIH Public Access Policy. Besides points about making open access mandatory, to which the NIH complied in 2008, it argues to extend self-archiving to the full spectrum of major US-funded research. In addition, the FRPAA would no longer stipulate that the self-archiving must be central; the deposit can now be in the author's own institutional repository (IR). The new U.S. National Institutes of Health's Public Access Policy took effect in April 2008 and states that "all articles arising from NIH funds must be submitted to PubMed Central upon acceptance for publication". It stipulates self-archiving in PubMed Central regardless of the use of the author's own institutional repository. In 2012, the NIH announced it would enforce its Public Access Policy by blocking the renewal of grant funds to authors who don't follow the policy.

In February 2013, the Fair Access to Science and Technology Research bill was introduced into both houses of Congress. It was described as a "strengthened version of FRPAA".

Also in 2013, the White House issued a directive requiring federal agencies "with over $100 million in annual conduct of research and development expenditures" to develop, within the next 6 months, a plan to make the peer-reviewed publications directly arising from Federal funding "publicly accessible to search, retrieve, and analyze".

As a result, open-access repositories and multi-annual open access strategies have been developed by federal institutions like the Department of Agriculture and the Department of Energy. DOE also hosts OSTI.gov, a repository with over 3 million records for federal works of which over 700,000 have full text as of 2019.

In 2019, the GAO issued a report on the implementation of the 2013 directive, with 37 recommendations to 16 agencies.

On August 25, 2022 US Office of Science and Technology Policy under Biden's administration issued guidance to make all federally funded research in the USA (the first country to do so) freely available without delay, thus ending over 50 years of Serials crisis albeit only for the US contributions.

=== European funding agencies ===
In April 2006, the European Commission recommended: "EC Recommendation A1: "Research funding agencies... should [e]stablish a European policy mandating published articles arising from EC-funded research to be available after a given time period in open access archives..." This recommendation has since been updated and strengthened by the European Research Advisory Board (EURAB). The project OpenAIRE (Open Access Infrastructure for Research in Europe) has since been launched.

The global shift towards open access to the results of publicly funded research (publications and data) has been a core strategy in the European Commission to improve knowledge circulation and thus innovation. It is illustrated in particular by the general principle for open access to scientific publications in Horizon 2020 and the pilot for research data. In 2012, via a Recommendation, the European Commission encouraged all EU Member States to put publicly funded research results in the public sphere in order to strengthen science and the knowledge-based economy. In 2017 it emerged that the European Commission are looking to create its own open access publishing platform for papers that emerge from the Horizon 2020 programme. The platform is likely to be similar to the one used by Wellcome Trust for Wellcome Open Research and Gates Foundation's Gates Open Research.

To somewhat improve on the European Commission's (and FRPAA's) allowable embargo of up to six months, EURAB has revised the mandate: all articles must be deposited immediately upon acceptance for publication; the allowable delay for complying with publisher embargoes applies only to the time when access to the deposit must be made open access rather than to the time when it must be deposited. Immediate deposit is required so that individual users can then request an immediate individual copy of any deposited eprint during the embargo period by clicking on a "RequestCopy" Button provided by the Institutional Repository software (e.g., DSPACE, EPrints). The Button automatically sends an email message to the author requesting an individual eprint; the author can comply with one click and the software immediately emails the eprint to the requestor. This is not open access, but may cover some immediate research needs during any embargo. A related idea was later put forth as the Open Access Button for papers that have not been deposited in an Institutional Repository.

== Effectiveness ==
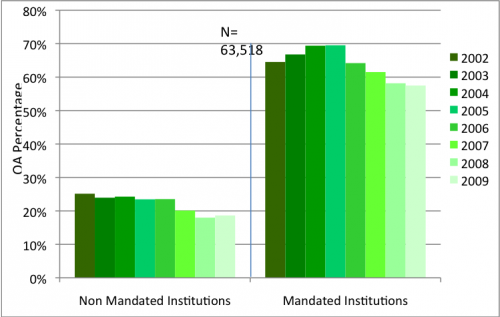
Mandates triple self-archiving rates

For the four institutions with the oldest self-archiving mandates, the averaged percentage of green open-access self-archiving has been compared to the percentage for control articles from other institutions published in the same journals (for years 2002–2009, measured in 2011). Open-access mandates triple the percent Green OA (see figure below). Respective totals are derived from the Thomson Reuters Web of Science.

=== Tracking mandates ===
As of May 2015, open-access mandates have been adopted by over 550 universities and research institutions, and over 140 research funders worldwide. Examples of universities which have open-access mandates are Harvard University and MIT in the United States, University College London in the UK and ETH Zürich in Europe. Funders which require open access when their funding recipients publish include the NIH in the US and RCUK and ERC in the EU. Mandate policy models and guidance have been provided by the Open Society Institute's EPrints Handbook, EOS, OASIS and Open Access Archivangelism.

ROARMAP, the searchable Registry of Open Access Repository Mandates and Policies at the University of Southampton indexes the world's institutional, funder and governmental OA mandates (and the Open Access Scholarly Information Sourcebook (OASIS) as well as EnablingOpenScholarship (EOS) graph the quarterly outcome). SHERPA/JULIET is a SHERPA service which lists funder mandates only.

In international cross-disciplinary surveys conducted by Swan (2005), the vast majority of researchers respond that they would self archive willingly if their institutions or funders mandated it. Outcome studies by Sale (2006) have confirmed these survey results. Both mandated and unmandated institutional and disciplinary repositories worldwide are indexed by SHERPA's OpenDOAR and their rate of growth is monitored and displayed by the University of Southampton's Registry of Open Access Repositories (ROAR).

Recent studies have tested which mandate conditions are most effective in generating deposit. The three most important conditions identified were: (1) immediate deposit required, (2) deposit required for performance evaluation, and (3) unconditional opt-out allowed for the OA requirement but no opt-out allowed for the deposit requirement.

== Policies adopted by research universities ==
The information which follows relates more closely to open access policies/mandates covering open publishing of research outputs than to OER specifically. An open-access policy enacted by the Faculty of a research university can empower them in choosing how to distribute their own scholarly work. If a faculty member wishes to grant exclusive rights to a publisher, they would first need to request a waiver from their faculty governance body. Some reasons to implement this kind of policy institution-wide are to:

1. increase the overall impact of an institution's research contributions to the global knowledge economy,
2. individual faculty receive their institution's full support in a unified action to work with publishers to simplify procedures and broaden access to their scholarly work (allowing for greater possibilities for citations of their work - important for hiring, tenure and promotion decisions),
3. take advantage of scholarly interactions with a greater diversity of readers, not just those who can afford to purchase the information from a vendor or attend an academic conference.

This kind of blanket policy provides support to those whose research is not part of a project that requires open access to the research done. For example, since the February 2013 directive from the United States Office of Science and Technology Policy, U.S. federal agencies have been developing their own policies on making research freely available within a year of publication.

SPARC, the Scholarly Publishing and Academic Resources Coalition, led the collaborative and open effort to create an "Open Access Spectrum" that demonstrates a more sophisticated approach is needed in discussions about the concept of openness in research communications. The "HowOpenIsIt? Guide (as well as an FAQ document and slide deck) is available for download on the SPARC website. Another useful guide has been developed by members of the Harvard Office for Scholarly Communication, the Harvard Open Access Project, and the Berkman Center for Internet and Society. This online guide, "Good practices for university open-access policies" is built on a wiki and is designed to evolve over time, according to the co-authors: Emily Kilcer, Stuart Shieber and Peter Suber.

=== United States ===
==== California Institute of Technology ====
On June 10, 2013, the Faculty Board of the California Institute of Technology (Caltech) created an institution-wide Open Access Policy. The ruling stated that as of January 1, 2014, all Caltech faculty must agree to grant nonexclusive rights to Caltech to disseminate their scholarly papers either via the authors' own sites or to Caltech AUTHORS, the online repository. The goal is to encourage wider distribution of their work and to simplify the copyright process when posting research on faculty or institutional Web sites. The initiative was put in place to prevent publishers of those journals from threatening legal action or issuing takedown notices to authors who have posted their content on their own sites or to CaltechAUTHORS, an online repository for research papers authored by Caltech faculty and other researchers at Caltech.

==== Duke University ====
On March 21, 2010, the Duke University Academic Council voted to support the University Library's new data repository, DukeSpace, with a blanket policy to provide open access to their scholarly writings. The policy allows for faculty members to opt out at any time, and it is regularly reviewed to determine its effectiveness.

Duke also in 2010 joined the Compact for Open-Access Publishing Equity (COPE) and established a fund to help Duke faculty members to cover any author fees required to publish in open access journals.

==== Harvard University ====
On February 12, 2008, the Faculty of Arts and Sciences of Harvard University approved their Open Access Policy, granting to the President and Fellows of Harvard to "make available his or her scholarly articles and to exercise the copyright in those articles ... in a nonexclusive, irrevocable, paid-up, worldwide license..." Since then, several other schools within the University now participate in the Open Access Policies supported by the Office for Scholarly Communication: the Graduate School of Design, the School of Education, the Business School, the Law School, the Kennedy School of Government, the Divinity School, and the School of Public Health. The University's open-access repository is called DASH (Digital Access to Scholarship at Harvard) which is where the faculty upload their scholarly articles for access by all.

==== Massachusetts Institute of Technology ====
Adopted by a unanimous vote on March 18, 2009, the Massachusetts Institute of Technology (MIT) Faculty adopted an open access policy. The policy applies to "all scholarly articles written while the person is a member of the Faculty except for any articles completed before the adoption of this policy and any articles for which the Faculty member entered into an incompatible licensing or assignment agreement before the adoption of this policy." The MIT online repository is called DSpace@MIT and it was designed to work seamlessly with Google Scholar. The Faculty revised and updated the policy in 2010 to take into consideration the various issues associated with the MIT librarians' discussions with publishers.

==== Princeton University ====
In 2010 the Dean of the Faculty of Princeton University appointed an ad-hoc committee of faculty and the University Librarian to study the question of open access to faculty publications - and in March 2011, the committee recommended several changes to the Faculty rules to allow for a blanket policy for open access to Princeton faculty scholarship. The faculty approved an open access policy on September 19, 2011, which was last revised in January 2012.

==== Stanford University ====
On June 26, 2008, the Stanford University Graduate School of Education (GSE) were the first in that school to grant permission to the University to make their scholarly articles publicly accessible and to exercise the copyright in a "nonexclusive, irrevocable, worldwide license ... provided that the articles are properly attributed to the authors not sold for a profit." The GSE Open Archive houses and makes publicly available the GSE authors' working papers as well as published articles. Between May 21-24th, 2013, the Stanford GSE doctoral students voted in favor of a motion to enact an Open Access policy. At this time, however, despite the strong case made by Professors John Willinsky and Juan Pablo Alperin, no other Stanford academic units have stepped forward.

==== University of California ====
On July 24, 2013, the Academic Senate of the University of California (UC) approved the UC Open Access Policy for all 8,000 plus faculty at their ten campuses. Some confusion at the local campuses led to online postings of journal articles whose copyright was already owned by publishers. For example, in December 2013, the academic publishing company Elsevier sent several UC faculty notices to take down certain journal articles posted openly on their campus webpages, e.g., on the department websites or faculty profiles. The UC Open Access Policy protected those faculty who had correctly uploaded their articles to the UC eScholarship repository. In another case of misunderstanding by the faculty about open access, in March 2014 the University received a Digital Millennium Copyright Act (DMCA) takedown notice for nine articles owned by the American Society for Civil Engineers (ASCE). The UC faculty authors had uploaded to eScholarship the publisher-formatted articles between 2004 and 2008, before the UC Open Access Policy had been enacted and in violation of the publisher's agreement with the authors when they gave their copyrights to the ASCE.

==== University of Colorado Boulder ====
In 2014 the Faculty Assembly of the University of Colorado Boulder approved the CU Boulder Open Access Policy "in order to allow for broad dissemination of their research." They granted to The Regents of the University of Colorado "a nonexclusive, irrevocable, worldwide license to exercise any and all rights under copyright relating to their scholarly work, as long as the works are properly attributed to the authors and not used for commercial purposes"—and that the individual faculty would retain full ownership of the material. Authors at CU Boulder are expected to inform publishers about the University's policy and that they "have granted a pre-existing License." The digital repository, CU Scholar, is maintained by the University Libraries and functions under a set of policies derived from the Open Access Policy. Contributions from the CU Boulder community can include working papers and technical reports, published scholarly research articles, completed manuscripts, digital art or multimedia, conference papers and proceedings, theses and dissertations, Undergraduate Honors theses, journals published on campus, faculty course-related output primarily of scholarly interest, and data sets. The Chancellor's Executive Committee recently approved the new policy, following the lead of the Council of Deans and the Office of the Provost and Executive Vice Chancellor.

==== University of Kansas ====
In 2005 the University of Kansas (KU) created KU ScholarWorks, a digital repository for scholarly work created by KU faculty and staff. Faculty Senate President Lisa Wolf-Wendel, professor of education leadership and policy studies, approved a new policy, "Open Access Policy for University of Kansas Scholarship" on April 30, 2009, in order to provide the broadest possible access to the journal literature authored by KU faculty." In June 2009, under a faculty-initiated policy approved by Chancellor Robert Hemenway, KU became the first U.S. public university to implement an open access policy. Unless a KU author sought a waiver, all articles must be submitted to KU ScholarWorks. "Processes to Implement the KU Open Access Policy " were endorsed by the Faculty Senate in February 2010. Theses and dissertations at the University of Kansas are also openly available, however in 2010 KU Graduate Studies established a policy that a student may request permission to embargo its publication for six months, one year or two years. Graduates earning the KU Master of Fine Arts in Creative Writing or PhD in English (Literature and Creative Writing track) may request a permanent embargo.

== See also ==
- NIH Public Access Policy
- ROARMAP
- SHERPA/Juliet

== Sources ==
- Suber, Peter (2012). Open access (The MIT Press Essential Knowledge Series ed.). Cambridge, Mass.: MIT Press. ISBN 9780262517638.
  - See especially Chapter 4, Policies and Section 4.2, Digression on the word "Mandate".
