= Registry of Open Access Repositories =

Searchable international database

- Registry of Open Access Repositories
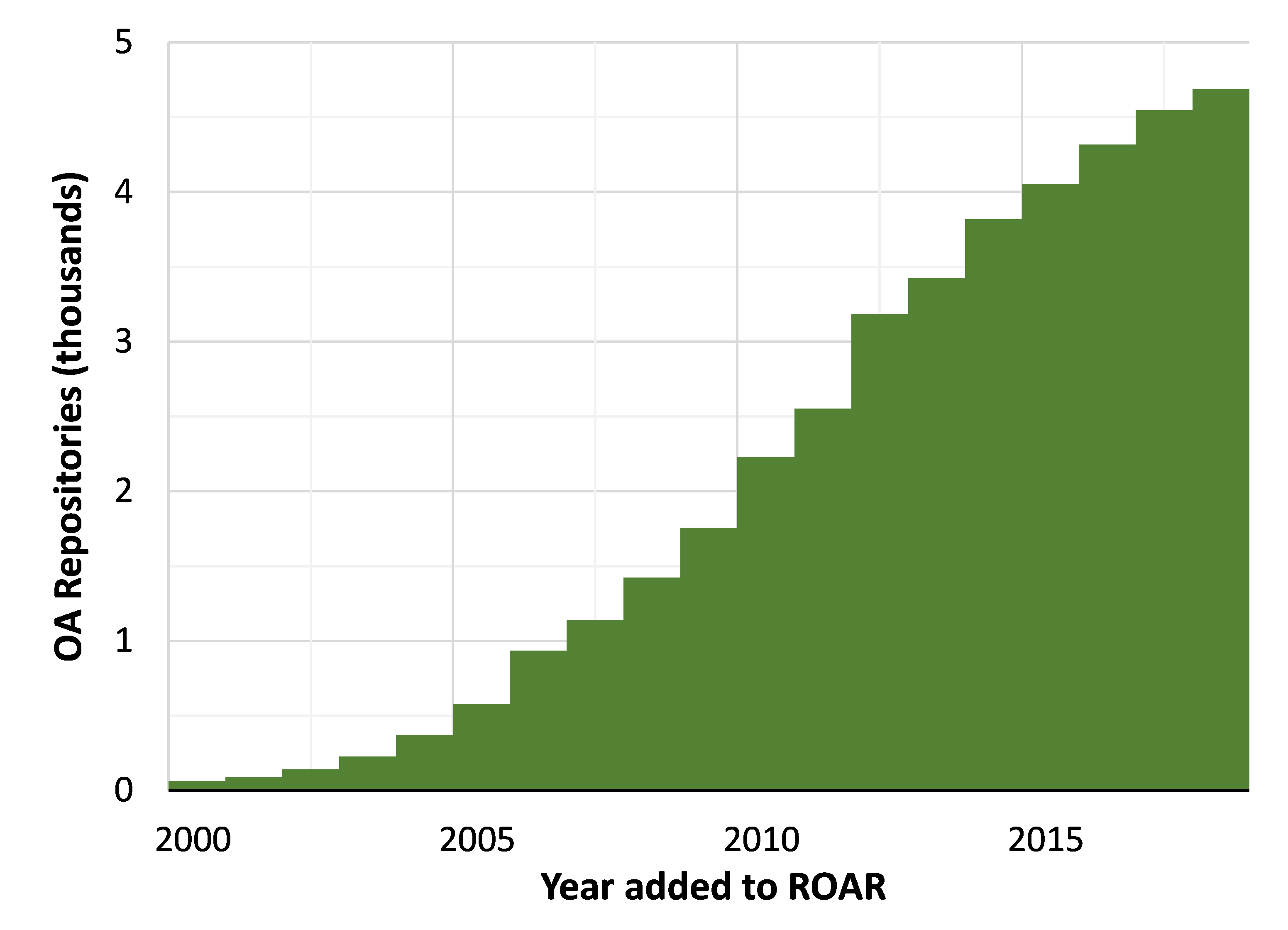
- ROAR Growth of open access repositories, 2000-2018
- Formation: 2003
- Website: http://roar.eprints.org

The Registry of Open Access Repositories (ROAR) is a searchable international database indexing the creation, location and growth of open access institutional repositories and their contents. ROAR was created by EPrints at University of Southampton, UK, in 2003. It began as the Institutional Archives Registry and was renamed Registry of Open Access Repositories in 2006. To date, over 3,000 institutional and cross-institutional repositories have been registered.

As of 2015, ROAR and the UK-based Directory of Open Access Repositories (OpenDOAR) "are considered the two leading open access directories worldwide. ROAR is the larger directory and allows direct submissions to the directory. OpenDOAR controls submission of materials and is dependent on the discretion of its staff. OpenDOAR requires open access of scholarly publications; whereas ROAR allows other types of materials to be included. ROAR allows filtering by country, type of repository, and sorting by repository name."

== ROARMAP ==
ROAR's companion Registry of Open Access Repository Mandates and Policies (ROARMAP) is a searchable international database of policies. It charts the growth of open access mandates and policies adopted by universities, research institutions and research funders that require their researchers to provide open access to their peer-reviewed research article output by depositing it in an open access repository.

It was created by EPrints at University of Southampton in 2003. The Institutional Self-Archiving Policy Registry became the Registry of Open Access Repository Material Archiving Policies in 2006, then the Registry of Open Access Repositories Mandatory Archiving Policies, and then the Registry of Open Access Repository Mandates and Policies around 2014.

ROARMAP mandates are classified in terms of strength and effectiveness in MELIBEA As of October 2015, open-access mandates have been adopted by more than 520 universities and more than 75 research funders worldwide.
