= Council of Australian University Librarians =

Cooperative library organization

- Type: Incorporated
- Founded: 1965
- Headquarters: Canberra, Australia
- Key people: Jill Benn, President
- Number of employees: 4
- Website: http://www.caul.edu.au/

The Council of Australian University Librarians (CAUL) is a representative leadership body for university libraries in Australia. The CAUL members represent 39 Australian University Institutions and 8 New Zealand University Institutions. Membership is restricted to library directors whose parent institutions are full members of Universities Australia.

== Purpose of the CAUL ==
The CAUL's shared purpose is to transform how people experience knowledge - how it can be discovered used and shared. The CAUL aims to unify university libraries so that they can optimise learning outcomes and maximise information resources available to researchers and facilitate their access.

Further, CAUL indicates two areas of focus:

1. Fair, affordable and open access to knowledge.
2. Digital Dexterity - the ability for individuals to use different technologies to improve their lifestyles.

== History of the CAUL ==
=== Early meetings of university librarians ===
Informally established in 1928, the CAUL has been described by Derek Fielding as "possibly the oldest voluntary meeting of libraries in Australia with a continuing history". The first meeting was held at Melbourne University in 1928 under the title of the Conference of Representatives of Australian University Librarians. At this meeting it was decided that "conferences of University Librarians should be held from time to time to discuss matters affecting the interest of libraries of the Australian Universities".

In 1955, most librarians noted that they wished to preserve the informality of these meetings and stated that the librarians should institute a regular conference.

However, in 1958, in the light of the Murray Reforms and developments in the funding and support of universities, the group found cause to consider becoming more formally organised.

=== Troubled beginnings ===
Between 1958 and 1962, Dr Andrew Osborn from the University of Sydney was the group chairman. In 1959 he attempted to implement a series of US librarian policies and other ambitious programs. According to Harrison Bryan a librarian from the University of Sydney these foreign programs and Osborn's direct role in the policy-making process "angered" the Australian Vice Chancellors Committee (AVCC). This period was described by Eoin Wilkinson, who was a University Librarian at Macquarie University to be a major set back for the CAUL

In 1961, Andrew Osborn informally withdrew as chairman and formally resigned in 1962.

=== Establishment of the CAUL ===
The CAUL was formally established in 1965 under the chairmanship of Harrison Bryan. In this meeting they established that the group formally constitute itself as a committee to be known as the Committee of Australian University Librarians.

Despite becoming a more formal organisation, the CAUL maintained a relaxed and informal environment until the 1980s. In the mid-1980s the CAUL conducted reforms to their operations. One of the reforms included the election of a chair and an increase in the number of meetings.

In 1995 the CAUL office was established, with Diana Costello as the inaugural executive officer.

In 1998, five of New Zealand's seven university librarians joined the CAUL for their annual meeting. Additionally, the CAUL first conducted a 'Best Practice Survey' to ensure the best practice service delivery.

=== Early 2000s to 2010 ===
in 2001, the CAUL created the Australian Information Literacy Standards, which was derived from the United States Information Literacy Standards for Higher Education.

The CAUL, ACODE and CAUDIT signed a Memorandum of Understanding in 2003. In 2004, the CAUL approved guidelines for the composition of committees and working groups, and guidelines for determining whether the CAUL will take up membership of associated organisations.

A review of the CAUL's committee structure was undertaken in 2010.

=== CAUL submission towards an Australian government Information Policy Issues Paper 1 ===
In 2011, Alex Byrne prepared a response to the Australian Government Information Policy Issues Paper 1. The CAUL stated that the Draft Principles on Open Public Sector Information supported "research, learning and teaching activities".

In particular the CAUL strongly endorsed the following principles within the paper:

1. Open access to information.
2. Robust information asset management frameworks.
3. Findable Information.
4. Open and accessible formats online.
5. Appropriate charging for access.
6. Clear reuse rights.
7. Engaging with the community.

=== 2016 to present ===
In 2016, the CAUL joined with other academic and research library organisations to form the International Alliance of Research Library Associations, known as IARLA.

On the 18th of February 2019, the Council of Australian University Librarians became an incorporated associated, known as CAUL inc. under the Associations Incorporation Act 1991.

In 2021 CAUL became an employer and established an office in the Chifley Building at the Australian National University in Canberra.

== Current services and programs ==
=== Advancing open scholarship (FAIR) ===
Article Processing charges (APCs) are central to the business models of many Open Access Journals. Libraries and institutions require better information about potential costs and savings. Advancing Open Scholarship (FAIR) is a program to "design and implement a consistent process for collection and reporting of article processing charges (APCs) in Australian Universities. The program aims to develop a methodology for the estimation of APC payments based on data sources such as Scopus, Web of Science and Unpaywall.

=== Content Procurement Services ===
The primary vehicle for the content procurement services is the CAUL Consortium. The Consortium is focused on improved value for money, enabling influence on the development of products and platforms and the transformation of access to digital scholarly content. It negotiates agreements aligned with acquisition of digital content, using the best possible pricing models.

=== Professional Development Services ===
The professional development program includes negotiations workshops, advocacy workshops, and the CAUL Leadership Institute (CLI). The CAUL Leadership Institute holds meetings/conferences and selects speakers that inform, challenge and provoke delegates from institutions to think about change. It also provides an opportunity for delegates to exchange experiences and develop a wider network. For example, in 2018, the CLI held a two day conference to highlight the major issues shaping the tertiary sector in Australia.

=== Statistics Services ===
The CAUL Statistics Services focuses on the presentation and collection of data from New Zealand and Australian member institutions. The purpose of this service is for cross-institutional bench-marking, facilitating the demonstration of value and impact, and enabling the provision of sector-level aggregate data for the profiling of Australian and New Zealand Libraries. In 2004, CAUL Statistics Services launched an interactive statistics site which is publicly accessible. Prior to this site interactive data was recorded in the "News Sheet of the University and College Libraries Section Library Association of Australia".

=== Building Sustainable Leadership Program ===
The Building Sustainable Leadership Program was originally termed "Inspiring Sustainability" because the aim was to highlight and focus on the future challenges that University Libraries would experience. The program directed by Gwenda Thomas focuses on three core areas of : (1) empowering workforce capabilities, (2) future-proofing scholarly information resources funding, and (3) advancing the United Nations 2030 Sustainable Development Goals. In the March 2021 Council meeting, Gwenda Thomas highlighted that the core themes of the program were on building leadership capability and capacity within the CAUL member institutions. It was stated that the programs event Building a Sustainable Reality would inspire these member institutions to work on their leadership capability and capacity when implementing sustainability throughout their institution.

The Program has two central projects:

The first project is: Learning from Bold Minds in Leadership Event Series. This project will include 6 online events targeted at CAUL member institution staff. The events will incorporate key event speakers and approach important topics that are relevant to the improvement of librarians.

The Second Project is: Senior Leadership Development and Networking Project. This project will revitalise CAUL's senior leadership to keep them current with the changing world. The project will achieve this by making recommendations to the CAUL board regarding; leadership development, leader networking and leadership awards. Additional activities that the project will implement include: environmental scan and benchmarking, and reviewing the CAUL Leadership Institute.

=== Respecting Indigenous Knowledge ===
The program director is Constance Wiebrands. The core tenets of the project are to uphold a culture of respect, reciprocity and responsibility with and for Indigenous culture and knowledge. The project states that they will achieve this through the development of strategic partnerships with Aboriginal and Torres Strait Islander communities. The outcomes that the program will develop are enhanced understanding of Indigenous culture as well as acknowledgement and greater respect for Aboriginal and Torres Strait Islander culture, language, artefacts, documents and records in libraries. The Indigenous Knowledges Symposium is a sub-project of this program that was held over two days in 2021. It was designed to ignite discussion on how academic libraries can work together to respect Indigenous knowledge.

== List of member institutions ==
CAUL and CONZUL - Member Institutions
Member Association	Official CAUL delegate
Auckland University of Technology (AUT)	Kim Tairi
Australian Catholic University (ACU)	Fides Datu Lawton
Australian National University (ANU)	Roxanne Missingham
Bond University	Sarah Fredline
Charles Darwin University	Anthony Hornby
Charles Stuart University	Karen Johnson
Central Queensland University (CQUniversity)	Mrs Anita Brown
Curtin University	Catherine Clark
Deakin University	Hero Macdonald
Edith Cowan University	Constance Wiebrands
Federation University Australia	Carmel Grant
Flinders University	Prashant Pandey
Griffith University	Ms Maureen Sullivan
James Cook University	Mrs Helen Hooper
La Trobe University	Fiona Salisbury
Lincoln University	Roger Dawson
Macquarie University	Belinda Tiffen
Massey University	Linda Palmer
Monash University	Robert Gerrity
Murdoch University	Matthew Evans
Queensland University of Technology	Nicole Clarke
RMIT University	David Howard
Southern Cross University	Bruce Munro
Swinburne University of Technology	Simon Huggard
University of Adelaide	Teresa Chitty
University of Auckland	Sue Roberts
University of Canberra	Christian West
University of Canterbury	Anne Scott
University of Melbourne	Gwenda Thomas
University of New England (UNE)	Blanca Pizzani
University of NSW (UNSW)	Martin Borchert
University of Newcastle	Coral Black
University of Notre Dame Australia	Stephen McVey
University of Otago	Mike Wall
University of Queensland	Caroline Williams
University of South Australia	Paul Sherlock
University of Southern Queensland	Clare Thorpe
University of Sydney (USYD)	Philip Kent
University of Tasmania	Janette Burke
University of Technology Sydney (UTS)	Michael Gonzalez
University of the Sunshine Coast	Chelsea Harper
University of Waikato	Ross Hallett
University of Western Australia	Jill Benn
University of Wollongong	Margie Jantti
Victoria University	Frances O'Neil
Victoria University of Wellington	Janet Fletcher
Western Sydney University	Pete Maggs
