= OpenDOAR =

Online database of open access repositories

- Available in: English
- Website: opendoar.ac.uk
- Commercial: No
- Current status: Online

OpenDOAR: Directory of Open Access Repositories is a UK-based website that lists open access repositories (including academic ones). It is searchable by locale, content, and other measures. The service does not require complete repository details and does not search repositories' metadata.

OpenDOAR is maintained by the University of Nottingham under the SHERPA umbrella of services and was developed in collaboration with Lund University. The project is funded by the Open Science Institute, Jisc, the Consortium of Research Libraries (CURL) and SPARC Europe.

As of 2015, OpenDOAR and the UK-based Registry of Open Access Repositories (ROAR) "are considered the Two leading open access directories worldwide. ROAR is the larger directory and allows direct submissions to the directory. OpenDOAR controls submission of materials and is dependent on the discretion of its staff. OpenDOAR requires open access of scholarly publications; whereas ROAR allows other types of materials to be included. ROAR allows filtering by country, type of repository, and sorting by repository name."

== See also ==
- List of academic databases and search engines
- OAIster
