= Open Access Week =

Annual scholarly communication event

A PhD Comics special for Open Access Week 2012

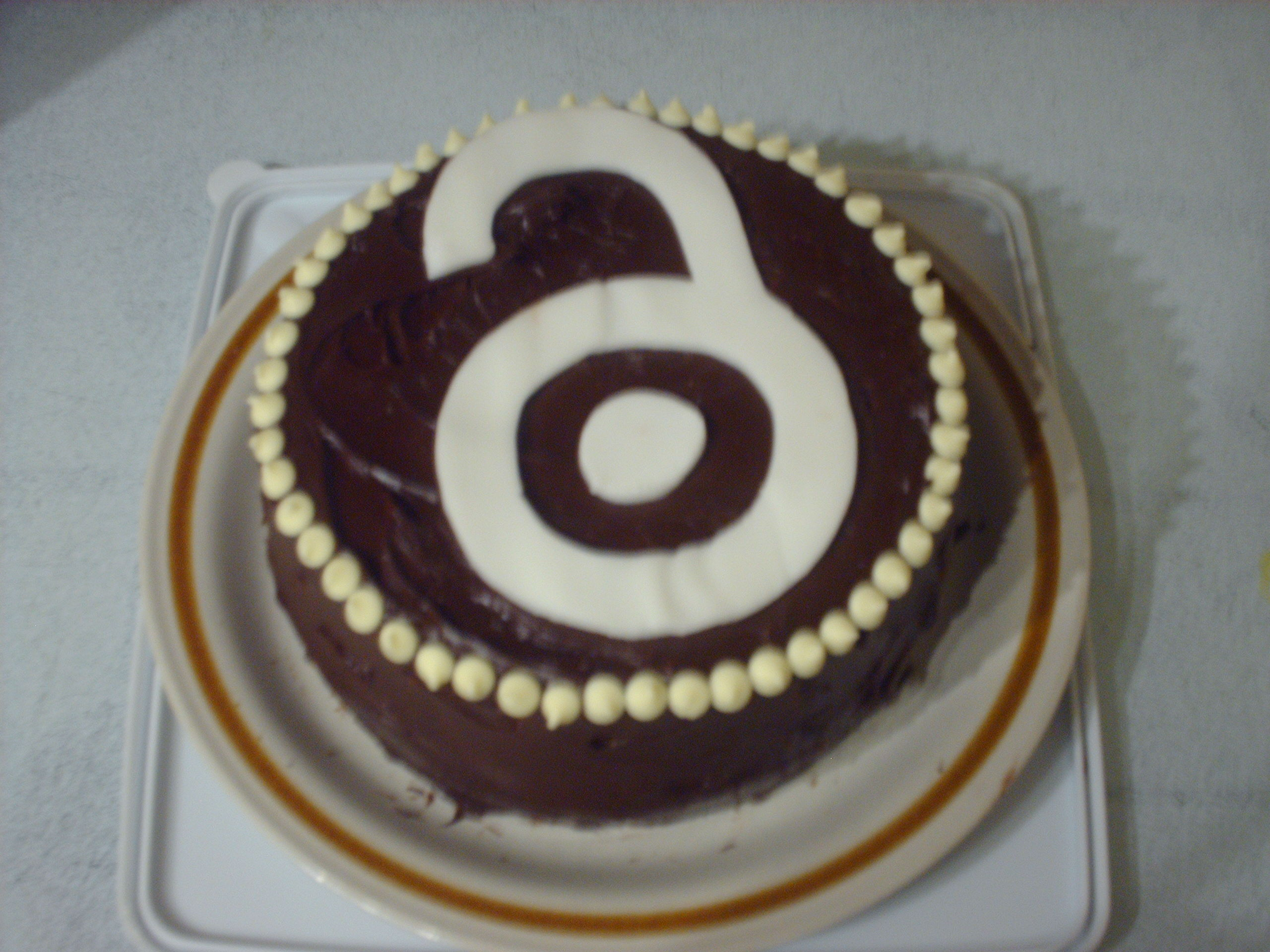
A cake baked for Open Access Week 2010 celebrations at the University of Lincoln, featuring the Open Access logo

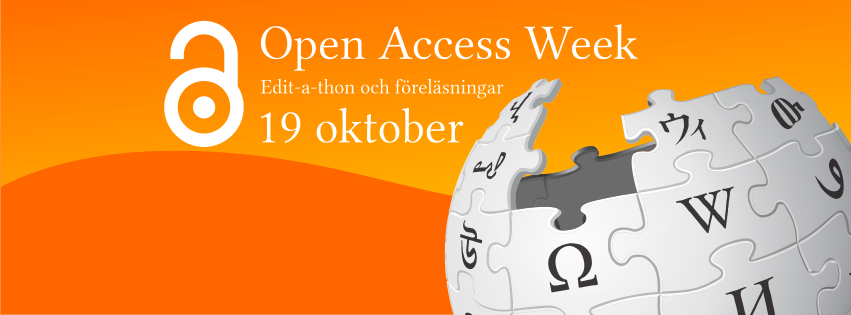
A web banner (in Swedish) for a Wikipedia edit-a-thon during Open Access Week 2015

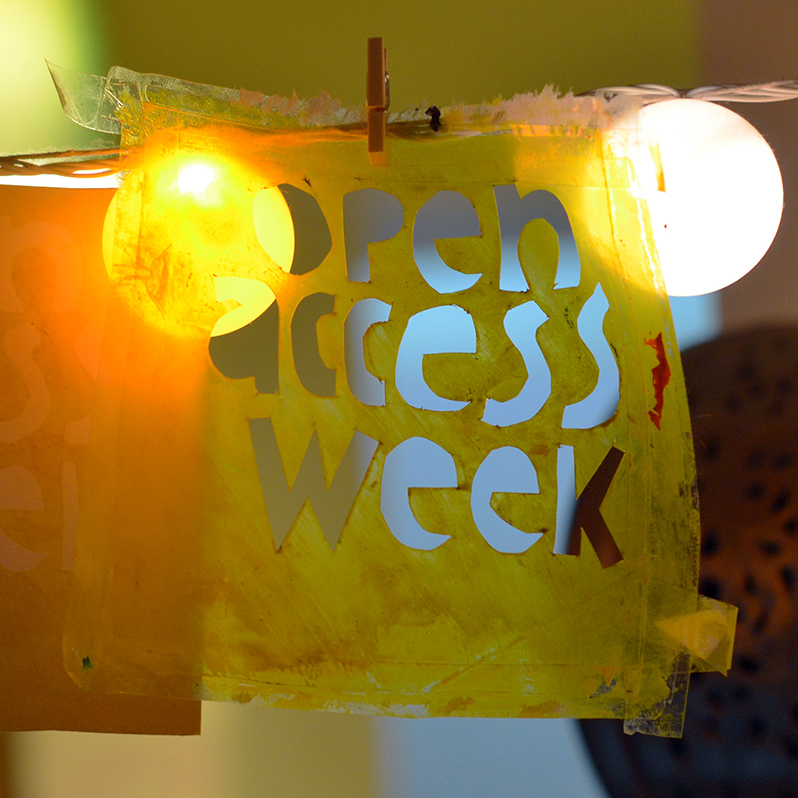
A stencil and a card with the text "Open Access Week"

Open Access Week is an annual scholarly communication event focusing on open access and related topics. It takes place globally during the last full week of October in a multitude of locations both on- and offline. Typical activities include talks, seminars, symposia, or the announcement of open access mandates or other milestones in open access. For instance, the Royal Society chose Open Access Week 2011 to announce that they would release the digitized backfiles of their archives, dating from 1665 to 1941.

== History ==
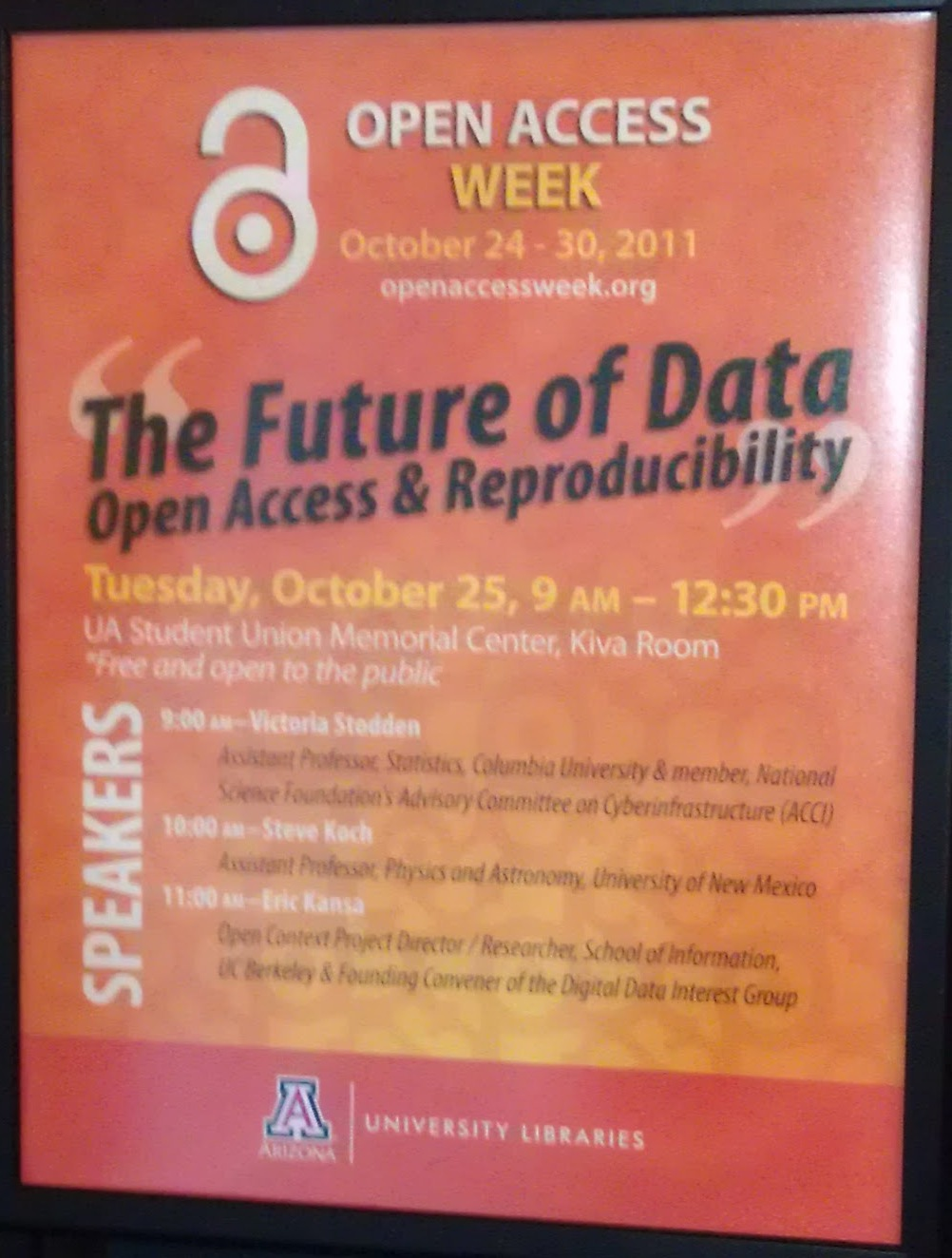
Example event, a symposium at the University of Arizona, October 25, 2011

Open Access Week has its roots in the National Day of Action for Open Access on February 15, 2007, organized across the United States by Students for Free Culture and the Alliance for Taxpayer Access. In 2008, October 14 was designated Open Access Day, and the event became global. In 2009, the event was expanded to a week, from October 19–23. In 2010, it took place from October 18–24. From 2011 onwards, it is taking place at the last full week of October each year.

== Themes ==
In the early years, organisations celebrating Open Access Week set their own themes. Since 2012, an 'official' theme was established and received special attention at the corresponding kick-off events held at the World Bank.

- 2012: "Set the default to open access"
- 2013: "Redefining impact"
- 2014: "Generation Open"
- 2015: "Open for Collaboration"
- 2016: "Open in Action"
- 2017: "Open In Order To"
- 2018: "Designing Equitable Foundations for Open Knowledge"
- 2019: "Open for Whom? Equity in Open Knowledge"
- 2020: "Open with Purpose: Taking Action to Build Structural Equity and Inclusion"
- 2021: “It Matters How We Open Knowledge: Building Structural Equity”
- 2022: "Open for Climate Justice"
- 2023: "Community over Commercialisation"
- 2024: "Community over Commercialisation"
- 2025: "Who Owns Our Knowledge?"
- 2026: The Cost of Knowledge

== Events ==
Each year's Open Access Week events are recorded in the Open Access Directory and the Open Access Week website.

== See also ==
- Science festival
