= MyCoRe =

- Developer: MyCoRe Team
- Initial release: 2001
- Stable release: 2025.06 / 27 June 2025; 6 months ago
- Repository: github.com/MyCoRe-Org
- Written in: Java, JavaScript, XSLT
- Operating system: Cross-platform
- Available in: German
- Type: Institutional repository, disciplinary repository, digital library
- License: GPL
- Website: www.mycore.org

MyCoRe (portmanteau of My Content Repository) is an open source repository software framework for building disciplinary or institutional repositories, digital archives, digital libraries, and scientific journals. The software is developed at various German university libraries and computer centers. Although most MyCoRe web applications are located in Germany, there are English-language applications, such as "The International Treasury of Islamic Manuscripts" at the University of Cambridge (UK).

== History ==
The first public version of MyCoRe was released in October 2001. Since then the software was developed by the MyCoRe team. The software became known as "Institutional Repository Software" as declared on the site of the Budapest Open Access Initiative. In Germany there are more than 20 Universities and institutions that provide over 70 repositories based on MyCoRe.

== Technology ==
The MyCoRe framework was written in Java and XML. It is available as free software under GNU General Public License (GPL).

== Features ==
Some important features of MyCoRe are as follows.

- Free and open-source software
- Customizable user interface
- Configurable metadata model: The Metadata Object Description Schema is the default metadata format within the MyCoRe sample application "MIR". Any other metadata format can be configured.
- Classifications can be edited or imported, as standard (e.g. DDC), in flat or hierarchical structure.
- Roles and rights are configurable
- There is an internal file system integrated in the MyCoRe framework.
- MyCoRe uses Checksum to ensure data integrity.
- All types of digital content, file formats and mime types can be assembled, managed, preserved and presented.
- An image viewer is integrated for presenting high-resolution digitized images in Web browser.
- MyCoRe supports common interoperability standards and interfaces such as the OAI-PMH 2.0 protocol or SWORD.
- MyCoRe provides an integrated Web content management system (WCMS) for editing static website content.
- Local or external authentication mechanisms can be used.
- A detailed rights and role concept allows to manage the access to data and metadata.
- MyCoRe provides a ready to install sample repository called MIR, which a system administrator can install on a single Linux, Mac OSX or Windows box to get started.

== Operating Systems ==
MyCoRe software runs on Linux, Solaris, Unix, or Windows.

== See also ==
- Digital library
- DSpace Repository Software
- Institutional repository
- Fedora Repository Software
- Opus Software
- SWORD
