= Cork LGBT+ Archive =

Community archive of LGBT history in Cork, Ireland

The Cork LGBT Archive is a community archive that gathers, preserves, digitises and shares material relating to the history of the Lesbian, Gay, Bisexual and Transgender (LGBT) communities of Cork, Ireland. It was founded in 2013 by Orla Egan, an Irish LGBT activist, educator and historian, and documents LGBT community formation and activism in Cork from at least the 1970s onward. The archive's physical collections are housed at Cork Public Museum, with digital versions held in the Digital Repository of Ireland and on Europeana.

== Background ==
The Cork LGBT Archive was established in 2013 by Orla Egan, who was working with the Cork Gay Project at the time, and began with her acquisition of the Arthur Leahy Collection. This collection consists of 104 boxes and an estimated 4,500 documents relating to Cork's LGBT social and cultural history from the 1960s to the present, gathered by Arthur Leahy over fifty years. In 2016, the archive received a Hidden Heritage Award from the Heritage Council of Ireland, its first grant, which funded the purchase of acid-free storage boxes for the collection.

The archive began collaborating with Cork Public Museum in 2017, when the museum agreed to house its collections. Museum and archive staff subsequently worked together to catalogue, transcribe and digitise the collection.

== Digital preservation ==
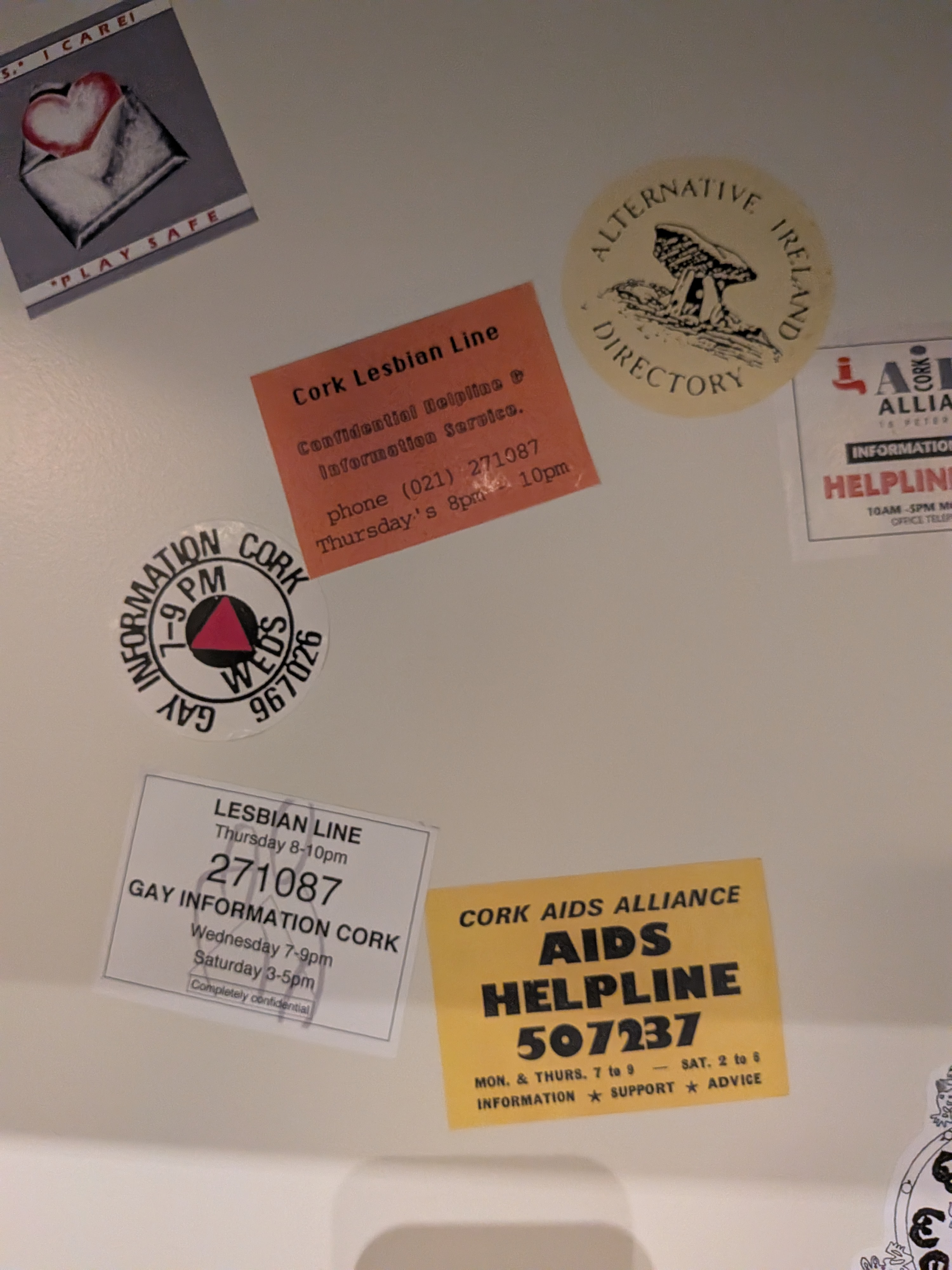
Reproduction archival stickers, including for the Cork Lesbian Line and Gay Information Cork helplines, on display as part of the We Were Always Here exhibition

In 2019, the Cork LGBT Archive was announced as the winner of the inaugural Digital Repository of Ireland (DRI) Community Archive Scheme, receiving a year's free associate DRI membership. DRI's education and outreach manager described the archive as being "of considerable social relevance, not only for LGBT community activism but also for other social change movements and Irish history in general". In October 2019 the collection was digitised and published in the DRI repository for the first time, including material such as posters, leaflets and newspaper coverage of the first Cork LGBT float in the city's 1992 Saint Patrick's Day parade. In February 2020, a selection of the archive's material was published on Europeana as part of the Europeana Common Culture project.

In January 2021, the Cork LGBT Archive added its name to an open letter published by the Collectif Archives LGBTQI, signed by 45 LGBTQ+ archives from 22 countries, in support of community-led queer archives and their establishment with state financial backing. A further Heritage Council grant that year funded the purchase of an A3 scanner and audio-visual equipment, and supported the hiring of two early-career researchers, Patrick Egan and Mira Dean, to digitise material over the summer of 2021. During this period the archive also launched an Instagram account and began recording oral history interviews.

== Collections and access ==
The archive's collections span material from the 1960s to the present, including photographs, posters, badges, newsletters, membership cards and periodicals documenting LGBT activism, community spaces and social life in Cork. Digital items are made freely available online through the Digital Repository of Ireland and Europeana, as well as the archive's own website. Items are licensed under a Creative Commons Attribution Non-commercial No-Derivatives licence, with associated metadata released under CC0.

== Exhibitions, publications and documentaries ==
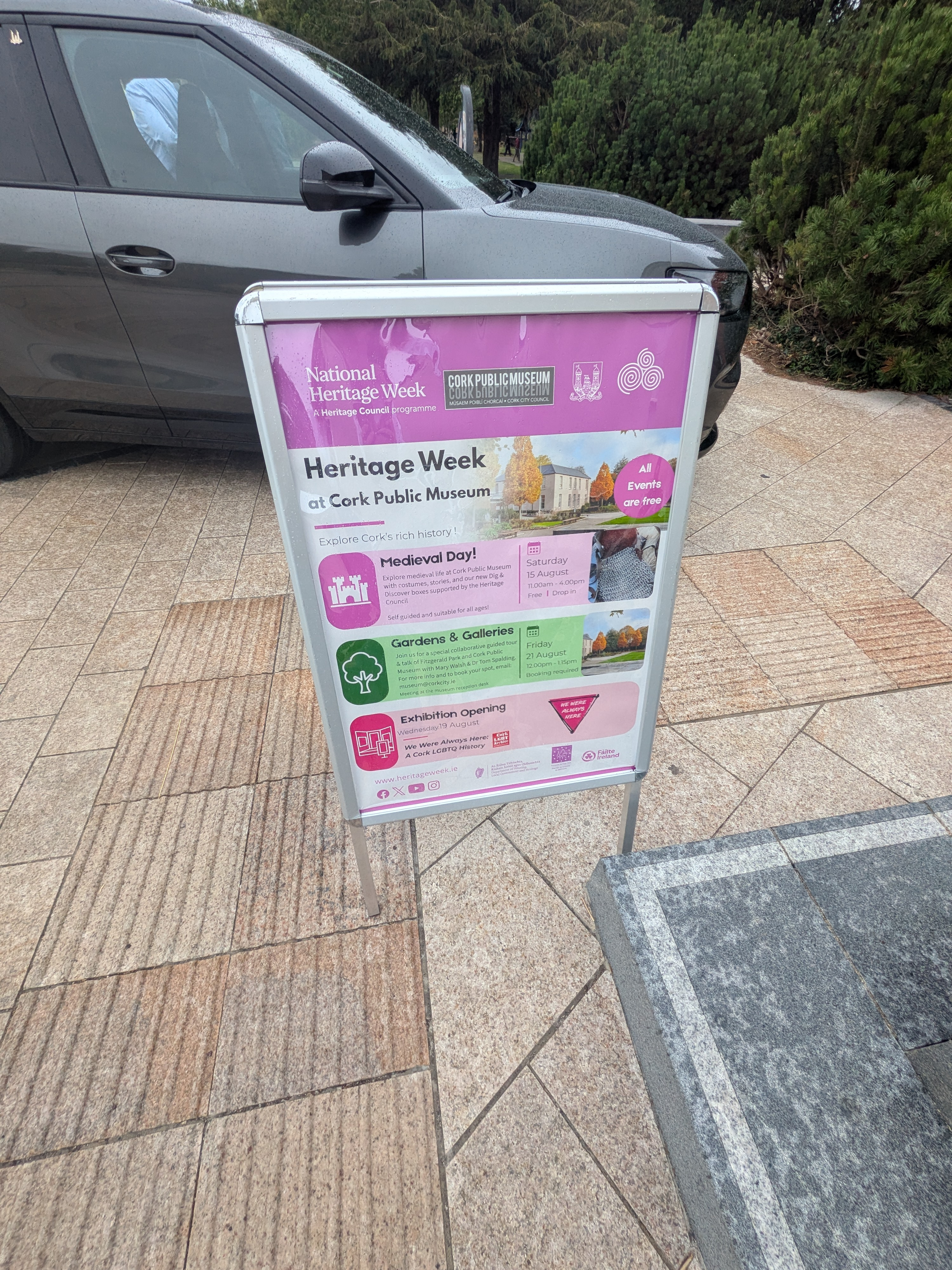
A Heritage Week sign at Cork Public Museum advertising the opening of the We Were Always Here exhibition, August 2026

The archive has produced several exhibitions, including the Queer Republic of Cork Exhibition and the Cork Queeros Exhibition, a photography exhibition of Cork LGBT activists, artists and athletes ranging in age from participants born in 1945 to those born in 1999, shown in Cork City Library and St Peter's Cork during Heritage Week 2021. In July 2023 it curated the Art & Activism Exhibition as part of the Cork Pride Festival.

Orla Egan is the author of Queer Republic of Cork: Cork's Lesbian, Gay, Bisexual & Transgender Communities 1970s–1990s (2016) and the graphic memoir Diary of an Activist (2022), published by Cork City Libraries. The archive's material has also formed the basis of several documentary films, including Out and About (2005), narrated by Egan and John Dunlea as part of Cork's year as European Capital of Culture; I'm Here, I'm Home, I'm Happy (2022), on LGBTQ+ life in Cork during the 1970s to 1990s; and LOAFERS (2023), marking the fortieth anniversary of Loafers Bar, which premiered at the IndieCork Film Festival.

=== Permanent exhibition at Cork Public Museum ===
In August 2026, Cork Public Museum opened We Were Always Here - Cork LGBT History, a permanent exhibition developed in collaboration with the archive. It was the first permanent LGBT+ exhibition in an Irish museum, and its opening coincided with the fiftieth anniversary of the opening of Cork's first gay centre, on MacCurtain Street in 1976. The exhibition was curated by Orla Egan with Richard Keyes McDonnell and Jamie Furey, and designed by Darren O'Connor; it was funded by Cork City Council, the Heritage Council of Ireland, and the Department of Culture, Communication and Sport. It followed earlier permanent exhibitions at the museum on Irish Travellers (2005) and the Cork Hebrew Congregation (2017).

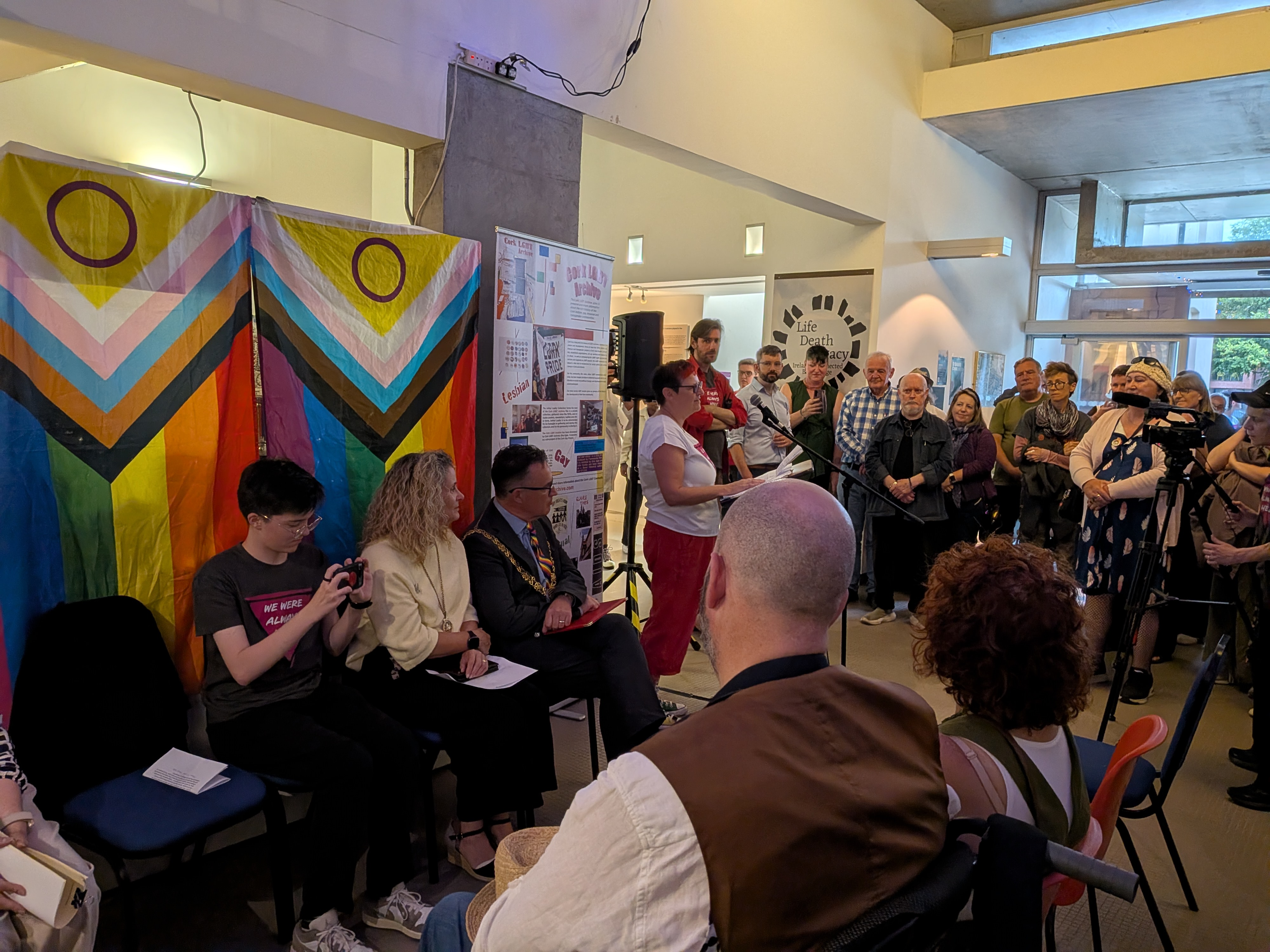
Orla Egan speaking at the opening of the We Were Always Here exhibition, 19 August 2026

As part of the exhibition, the original Pride flag designed by Gilbert Baker in 1978, normally held by the GLBT Historical Society in San Francisco, was loaned to Cork as the first stop on a world tour, marking the first time it had been displayed outside the United States. Cork was selected as the tour's opening venue in part owing to its status as a sister city of San Francisco. The flag's arrival was marked by a week of events from 17 to 24 August 2026, including a reception hosted by the Lord Mayor of Cork, Damien Boylan, and a public panel discussion on LGBTQ+ safety held at Cork City Hall.

== Public engagement ==
The archive runs walking tours and participates in local LGBTQ+ Pride events. In 2024, it collaborated with Queer Bike Rides Cork on a Cork Queer History Cycle, with Egan and Richard Keys McDonnell guiding participants between sites including McCurtain Street and Blackrock Castle. Egan has also spoken on archival practice at academic events, including a 2022 seminar on "Archiving Bodies: Digital Archives, Feminist and Queer Praxis" at Maynooth University, organised in collaboration with the DRI as part of the Full Stack Feminism in Digital Humanities project.

== Recognition ==
The Cork LGBT Archive and its founder have received a number of awards and honours.

Orla Egan received the UCC Athena Swan Equality Award in 2021 for her work on the archive, and the archive was a finalist in the Heritage category of the National Lottery Good Causes Awards the same year. In February 2025, it was named Group of the Month by the UK-based Community Archives and Heritage Group.

== See also ==
- Irish Queer Archive
- LGBT rights in Ireland
