= CollectionSpace =

Open source collections management system for museums

- Developer: Lyrasis
- Release: June 2010; 16 years ago
- Stable release: 9.0 / 2026
- Written in: Java
- Type: Content management system Collections management system
- License: Educational Community License 2.0
- Website: collectionspace.org
- Repository: github.com/collectionspace

CollectionSpace is an open source, web-based collections and content management system launched in 2010 to enable museums and cultural heritage organizations to manage and share collections. CollectionSpace is distributed under the Educational Community License 2.0, a free software license based on the Apache License.

== Development ==
Between 2008 and 2012, the Museum of the Moving Image in New York City and the University of California, Berkeley led a group of academic partners to develop the CollectionSpace software with funding support from the Andrew W. Mellon Foundation and the Institute of Museum and Library Services (IMLS). Personnel at the University of Cambridge in the UK and OCAD University in Toronto helped to develop the software architecture. As they built CollectionSpace, the development partners prioritized participatory and user-centered design. The first release of CollectionSpace took place in June 2010.

Early adopters or contributors included the Phoebe A. Hearst Museum of Anthropology, the University and Jepson Herbaria, the Miami-Dade Department of Cultural Affairs, the National Gallery of Denmark, and the Walker Art Center. By 2026, the number of cultural heritage organizations using hosted instances of CollectionSpace had surpassed 40, nearly all located in the United States.

In 2014, Lyrasis became the organizational home for CollectionSpace, providing administrative support and technical infrastructure for the global community of users as well as contributing code. In 2020, the Material Order consortium, which was cofounded by Harvard Graduate School of Design and Rhode Island School of Design, released the CollectionSpace public browser, enabling museums to share metadata and images of their collections with the public. In 2021, CollectionSpace gained the ability to import data in batch via spreadsheets. In 2025, CollectionSpace released software features to enable museums to comply with NAGPRA requirements. In September 2026, CollectionSpace launched version 9.0, which included significant web accessibility and other improvements.

CollectionSpace is one of several open source collections management systems in the cultural heritage community, including Omeka, Collective Access, and VuDL. Proprietary, commercial alternatives includes Axiell Collections, MuseumPlus, and eHive. Cultural heritage organizations can self-host CollectionSpace or contract with Lyrasis or other hosting service providers like Creative West.

== Features ==
CollectionSpace supports metadata management for collections of objects in archaeology, art, history, and natural history. Metadata records follow the Collections Trust's SPECTRUM standard but support other sources, including authority vocabularies from Chenhall, Getty, and Library of Congress. CollectionSpace also manages workflows and procedures such as acquisitions and loans.

The CollectionSpace staff interface is a web-based application accessible to an unlimited number of concurrent users via role-based permissions. The staff interface is where the metadata is managed. Organizations can share select objects and images with the public via the public browser (which is available as a WordPress plugin), use a CSV importer tool to load data in batch via spreadsheets, or use a native REST API to integrate CollectionSpace with other systems. Advanced searching and retrieval are also supported.

The CollectionSpace platform is built on Nuxeo. The service architecture is based on Apache Tomcat and a relational database such as PostgreSQL or MySQL. The back-end interface is built using Java. The user interface is developed using HTML, CSS, and JavaScript. The server-side software is compatible with modern operating systems, including Linux, Mac, and Windows.

In a 2015 study, CollectionSpace was rated as more user-friendly than other collections management systems widely used by cultural heritage organizations, including Fedora, Greenstone, EPrints, and Invenio, but was rated as less user-friendly than DSpace.
