= Open Knowledge Repository =

Open-access repository

The Open Knowledge Repository is the official open-access repository of the World Bank and features research content about development. It was launched in 2012, alongside the World Bank's Open Access Policy and its adoption of the Creative Commons Attribution (CC BY) license for all research and knowledge products that it publishes, which collectively made the World Bank the first international organization to completely embrace open access. The repository collects the intellectual output of the World Bank in digital form, disseminates it, and preserves it long-term.

== Contents ==
The Open Knowledge Repository features books, reports, serials, technical papers, working papers, and work studies. Among its contents are World Bank Group Annual Reports and Independent Evaluation Studies, books published by the World Bank Group, World Development Reports, and articles published in the journals World Bank Economic Review and World Bank Research Observer. The repository also receives articles by World Bank researchers published by third-party publishers as part of the World Bank's Open Access Policy, which allows such articles to be embargoed but discourages publishers from the practice.

The Open Knowledge Repository is regularly updated. At its launch in April 2012, it held over 2,000 documents. By August 2013, the repository held over 12,000 publications, mostly in English. As of February 2026, the repository contains almost 40,000 publicationsand a Multilingual Content collection.

== Purpose ==
The goal of the Open Knowledge Repository is to support innovation and allow anyone to turn the intellectual output of the World Bank "into solutions to development problems that will help improve the lives of poor people around the world". Former World Bank Group senior publishing officer José De Buerba described it as endeavoring "to be the world’s most complete research and knowledge repository related to international development". The repository was designed to serve a wide variety of users, including governments, civil society organizations, students, and the general public.

== Use ==
In its first two months of its existence, the Open Knowledge Repository accumulated 325,000 page views and 50,000 downloads. Between its launch in 2012 and August 2013, there were over 1.8 million downloads from the repository, 45% of which were from developing countries. At the time, China, India, and Vietnam were three of the top five countries by number of downloads, while 12 of the top 20 countries by downloads were developing countries. By April 2015, there had been over 6.3 million cumulative downloads, over 50% of which originated in the developing world. As of January 2026, over 112 million files had been downloaded from the repository.

Through its use of altmetrics, the Open Knowledge Repository has determined that, as of February 2026, its content had been used over 350,000 times in policy documents, by the press, in blogs and on social media, and on Wikipedia.

== Technical details ==
The Open Knowledge Repository is built on the open-source platform DSpace. It complies with Dublin Core Metadata Initiative (DCMI) standards and its metadata is exposed by the Open Archives Initiative Protocol for Metadata Harvesting (OAI-PMH). In the words of Diane Peters, the repository's adherence to DCMI and OAI-PMH demonstrate it was "built with an eye toward maximizing interoperability, discoverability, and reusability". Among its features are publicly available usage statistics, custom OAI metadata fields, author profiles, citation information for every work, and links to citations on Google Scholar and Scopus. The repository is also fully interoperable with other major repositories, such as Economists Online, Research Papers in Economics (RePEc), and the Social Science Research Network (SSRN).

Most content on the Open Knowledge Repository is available under the terms of the Creative Commons Attribution (CC BY) license. The repository's user interface is available in English, French, and Spanish. English was initially the only language offered, but French and Spanish were added in 2016. In January 2014, the repository's website was relaunched with a new responsive web design, enabling better access on mobile devices. The relaunch also enhanced the site's search capabilities, recommendations for related titles, and author profiles.

== Awards and recognition ==
The Open Knowledge Repository was honored as a SPARC Innovator in June 2012 by the Scholarly Publishing and Academic Resources Coalition (SPARC) and named one of the Best Free Reference Web Sites for 2013 by the American Library Association. Creative Commons called the OKR "one of the most important hubs for economic scholarship in the world".
