= DuraCloud =

Open source digital preservation software

- Original author: DuraSpace
- Developer: Lyrasis
- Release: November 7, 2011; 14 years ago
- Stable release: 8.1 / June 10, 2024; 2 years ago
- Written in: Java
- License: Apache License 2.0
- Website: duracloud.org
- Repository: github.com/duracloud/duracloud

DuraCloud is an open source digital preservation software originally developed by DuraSpace and maintained by Lyrasis since 2019. The DuraCloud software is available under the terms of the Apache License, Version 2.0. It is available as a hosted SaaS through Lyrasis and Texas Digital Library. Users can upload content via the SyncTool, REST API, command line, and staff interface, while content can be preserved using Amazon S3 Glacier. DuraCloud was primarily designed to be a back-end preservation system but also has the optional ability to provide public links to content.

== History ==
In 2009, the Library of Congress National Digital Information Infrastructure and Preservation Program (NDIIPP) and DuraSpace announced a joint pilot program to test the use of cloud technologies to enable perpetual access to digital content with DuraCloud. The pilot program entered a second phase in 2010. Several open source releases of the DuraCloud software led to the public launch of the managed service on November 7, 2011. DuraCloud 2.0 was released on April 17, 2012.

In 2019, DuraSpace merged into Lyrasis, which continued to host and support DuraCloud. In 2026, concerned about the long-term sustainability of the software, Lyrasis redesigned and relaunched DuraCloud as a product called DuraCloud Preserve.

== See also ==
- Cloud computing
- Cloud storage
- Digital preservation
- DSpace
