= Orla Egan =

Irish LGBTQ+ activist (born 1966)

- Born: 1966 (age 59–60); Cork, Ireland
- Education: University College Cork
- Occupations: LGBTQ+ activist, educator, historian and documentary film maker
- Employer(s): Cork Women’s Place, The Other Place LGBT Resource Centre, Irish Equality Authority’s Advisory Committee on Lesbians, Gays and Bisexuals, University College Cork
- Organization(s): Irish Anti Nuclear Movement, Cork LGBT+ Archive Archive]]
- Notable work: Diary of An Activist, Queer Republic of Cork, Cork Lesbian, Gay, Bisexual and Transgender Communities 1970s-1990s
- Website: wordpress.com

Orla Egan (born 1966) is an Irish LGBTQ+ activist, educator, historian and documentary film maker. She is the founder of the Cork LGBT+ Archive.

== Biography ==
Egan was born in Cork city in 1966. She came out to as a lesbian aged 16. As a young activist, in 1978 she joined the Irish Anti-nuclear movement to protest against government plans to build a nuclear power plant at Carnsore Point, County Wexford.

Egan studied towards a degree in European Studies at University College Cork, graduating in 1987, then completed a master's degree there in Women’s Studies in 1992. After graduating, she worked at Cork Women’s Place and The Other Place LGBT Resource Centre, sat on the Irish Equality Authority’s Advisory Committee on Lesbians, Gays and Bisexuals, and contributed to the Irish Higher Education Equality Unit (HEEU). She also organised the first Irish LGBT float in a Saint Patrick’s Day Parade in Cork in 1992.

During the Cork City of Culture in 2005, Egan was a narrator, along with John Dunlea, of a historical walking tour of LGBT Cork in the film Out and About produced by Framework Films.

Egan founded the Cork LGBT Archive in 2013, which began by her by acquisition of the Arthur Leahy Collection, then with receiving support from a Hidden Heritage Award from the Irish Heritage Council in 2016. The physical archive is housed at the Cork Public Museum and the digital archive is part of both the Digital Repository of Ireland and Europeana.

She released the graphic memoir Diary of An Activist in 2022, published by Cork City Libraries, and is also the author of Queer Republic of Cork, Cork Lesbian, Gay, Bisexual and Transgender Communities 1970s-1990s. She wrote the theatre play Leeside Lezzies.

In commemoration of the 40th anniversary of Loafers Bar in Cork in 1983, Egan produced the documentary LOAFERS which was premiered at the IndieCork Film Festival in 2023. It has also been screened at the "Pride on Screen – Queer Voices, New Stories" event at Wexford Pride in 2024. She has also created the film "I'm Here, I'm Home, I'm Happy," which was screened at Cork City Library.

As of 2021, Egan was a part-time lecturer in Digital Arts and Humanities, Women’s Studies and Applied Social Studies at her alma mater University College Cork whilst completing a PhD in Digital Arts and Humanities. She won the universities Annual Equality Award in 2021.

Egan's research and work have been cited in publications including Gay and Lesbian Activism in the Republic of Ireland, 1973-93 (2021), Emerging Technologies and Museums: Mediating Difficult Heritage (2022) and The Palgrave Handbook of Feminist, Queer and Trans* Narrative Studies (2025). She has reviewed Katherine O’Donnell's novel Slant for Gay Community News.

== Personal life ==
Egan has one child, born 2005 and is in a relationship with Cork-based documentary filmmaker Carol O'Keeffe.

== See also ==
- LGBT rights in the Republic of Ireland
- Cork LGBT+ Archive
- Loafers Bar
