= DSpace =

Repository software package

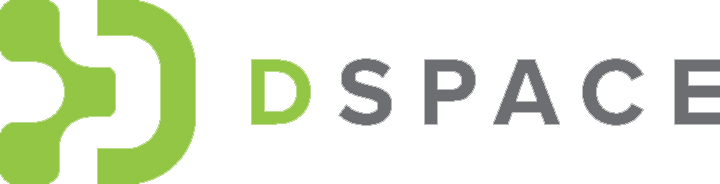
- Original authors: MIT and HP Labs
- Developer: The DSpace Program (parent organization: Lyrasis)
- Release: November 2002
Stable release
- 9.x: 10.0 / 28 May 2026; 2 months ago
- Written in: Java
- Type: Institutional repository software
- License: BSD licence
- Website: www.dspace.org
- Repository: https://github.com/DSpace/DSpace

DSpace is an open source repository software package typically used for creating open access repositories for scholarly and/or published digital content. While DSpace shares some feature overlap with content management systems and document management systems, the DSpace repository software serves a specific need as a digital archives system, focused on the long-term storage, access and preservation of digital content. The optional DSpace registry lists more than three thousand repositories all over the world.

== History ==
The first public version of DSpace was released in November 2002, as a joint effort between developers from MIT and HP Labs. Following the first user group meeting in March 2004, a group of interested institutions formed the DSpace Federation, which determined the governance of future software development by adopting the Apache Foundation's community development model as well as establishing the DSpace Committer Group. In July 2007 as the DSpace user community grew larger, HP and MIT jointly formed the DSpace Foundation, a not-for-profit organization that provided leadership and support. In May 2009, collaboration on related projects and growing synergies between the DSpace Foundation and the Fedora Commons organization led to the joining of the two organizations to pursue their common mission in a not-for-profit called DuraSpace. DuraSpace and Lyrasis merged in July 2019, and the DSpace software and user community continues to receive leadership and guidance from Lyrasis.

== Technology ==
DSpace is constructed with Java web applications, many programs, and an associated metadata store. The web applications provide interfaces for administration, deposit, ingest, search, and access. The asset store is maintained on a file system or similar storage system. The metadata, including access and configuration information, is stored in a relational database and supports the use of PostgreSQL and Oracle database. DSpace holdings are made available primarily via a web interface. More recent versions of DSpace also support faceted search and browse functionality using Apache Solr.

== Features ==
Some most important features of DSpace are as follows.

- Free open source software
- Completely customizable to fit user needs
- Manage and preserve all format of digital content (PDF, Word, JPEG, MPEG, TIFF files)
- Apache SOLR based search for metadata and full text contents
- UTF-8 Support
- Interface available in 22 languages
- Granular group based access control, allowing setting permissions down to the level of individual files
- Optimized for Google Scholar indexing
- Integration with BASE, CORE, OpenAIRE, Unpaywall and WorldCat

== Operating systems ==
DSpace software runs on Linux, Solaris, Unix, Ubuntu and Windows. It can also be installed on OS X. Linux is by far the most common OS for DSpace.

== Notable DSpace repositories ==
- The World Bank - Open Knowledge Repository
- Apollo - University of Cambridge Repository
- Digital Access to Scholarship at Harvard
- DSpace@MIT
- Spiral - Imperial College London Repository
- WHO Institutional Repository for Information Sharing

A full list of institutional repositories using DSpace software as well as others is available via the Registry of Open Access Repositories (ROAR) and at the DSpace Registry.

== See also ==
- Digital library
- DuraCloud
- Institutional repository
- Fedora Commons
- SWORD
- DSpace Alternatives Free and Open Source Software
  - Archipelago Commons - https://github.com/esmero
  - CKAN
  - Samvera
  - EPrints
  - Invenio
  - Islandora
  - Omeka
  - OPUS (software)
  - Zenodo
