= Institutional Web Management Workshop =

Series of workshop events organized by UKOLN

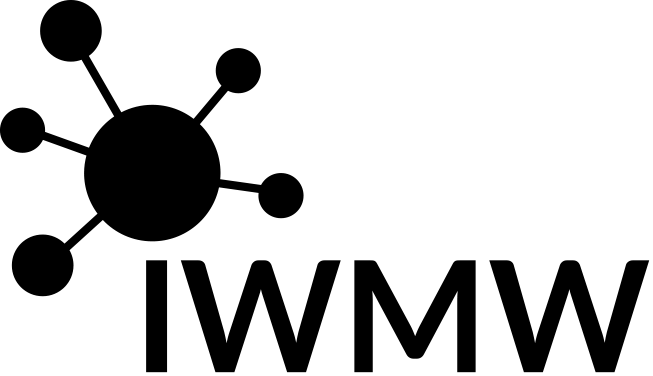
- Logo of the IWMW event (2017)
- Abbreviation: IWMW
- Discipline: World Wide Web

Publication details
- History: 1997–2019
- Frequency: Annual

Institutional Web Management Workshop (IWMW) was a series of workshop events which was originally organised by UKOLN to provide professional development for web managers, policy makers, developers, designers and information professionals related to the UK's higher education community. Following cessation of JISC's core funding for UKOLN, since 2014 the event was organised by UK Web Focus.

The event aimed to provide an opportunity for discussion and debate amongst the participants. A number of plenary talks addressed key areas of interest. However the main focus of the workshop centred on the parallel sessions, discussion groups and debates which enabled participants to be actively engaged with the issues facing those involved in the provision of institutional Web management services.

The workshop series began with a two-day event held at King's College London on 16 –17 July 1997. Following the success of the initial event, in 1998 the event was extended to a 3-day format, although in 2011, due to the economic climate, the event reverted to a 2-day format but returned to a 3-day format the following year.

The planned 2020 event at the University of Dundee was cancelled due to the COVID-19 pandemic, and 2019's event in Greenwich proved to be the final conference in the series.

== Noteworthy Incident at IWMW 2005 ==
The IWMW 2005 event was the first time a WiFi network was available for use by the participants. As described in a paper on "Using Networked Technologies To Support Conferences" this was an early example of an "amplified conference" with the provision of a number of networked technologies being used to support the event. The 7 July 2005 London bombings took place midway through the event. Participants who were making use of the network were first alerted to the news on the event's IRC channel, and a record of the discussions when the participants first became aware of the significance of this news is available.

== Full list of IWMW events ==
Table of IWMW Events
Event	Location	Town/City	Link	Theme
IWMW 2019	University of Greenwich	Greenwich	IWMW 2019 Web site (archive.org)	Times They Are A-Changin'!
IWMW 2018	University of York	York	IWMW 2018 Web site (archive.org)	Streamlining Digital
IWMW 2017	University of Kent	Canterbury	IWMW 2017 Web site (archive.org)	It’s The End of the Institution As We Know It (And We Feel Fine)
IWMW 2016	Liverpool John Moores University	Liverpool	IWMW 2016 Web site (archive.org)	Understanding Users; Managing Change; Delivering Services
IWMW 2015	Edge Hill University	Ormskirk	IWMW 2015 Web site (archive.org)	Beyond Digital: Transforming the Institution
IWMW 2014	Northumbria University	Newcastle	IWMW 2014 Web site (archive.org)	Rebooting the Web
IWMW 2013	University of Bath	Bath, Somerset	IWMW 2013 Web site	What Next?
IWMW 2012	University of Edinburgh	Edinburgh	IWMW 2012 Web site	Embedding Innovation
IWMW 2011	University of Reading	Reading, Berkshire	IWMW 2011 Web site	Responding to Change
IWMW 2010	University of Sheffield	Sheffield	IWMW 2010 Web site	The Web in Turbulent Times
IWMW 2009	University of Essex	Colchester	IWMW 2009 Web site	-
IWMW 2008	University of Aberdeen	Aberdeen	IWMW 2008 Web site	The Great Debate
IWMW 2007	University of York	York	IWMW 2007 Web site	Next Steps for the Web Management Community
IWMW 2006	University of Bath	Bath, Somerset	IWMW 2006 Web site	Quality Matters
IWMW 2005	University of Manchester	Manchester	IWMW 2005 Web site	Whose Web Is It Anyway?
IWMW 2004	University of Birmingham	Birmingham	IWMW 2004 Web site	Transforming The Organisation
IWMW 2003	University of Kent at Canterbury	Canterbury	IWMW 2003 Web site	Supporting Our Users
IWMW 2002	University of Strathclyde	Glasgow	IWMW 2002 Web site	The Pervasive Web
IWMW 2001	Queen's University Belfast	Belfast	IWMW 2001 Web site	Organising Chaos
IWMW 2000	University of Bath	Bath, Somerset	IWMW 2000 Web site	The Joined-Up Web
IWMW 1999	Goldsmiths College	London	IWMW 1999 Web site	The Next Steps
IWMW 1998	Newcastle University	Newcastle	IWMW 1998 Web site	Institutional Web Management
IWMW 1997	King's College London	London	IWMW 1997 Web site	Running An Institutional Web Service

== Feedback on the Event ==
Reports on IWMW events written by event delegates have been published for IWMW 2003, IWMW 2004, IWMW 2005, IWMW 2006, IWMW 2007, IWMW 2008, IWMW 2009, IWMW 2010, and IWMW 2012.
