= Mod oai =

Apache module

mod_oai is an Apache module that allows web crawlers to efficiently discover new, modified, and deleted web resources from a web server by using OAI-PMH, a protocol which is widely used in the digital libraries community. mod_oai also allows harvesters to obtain "archive-ready" resources from a web server.

The mod_oai project is housed at Old Dominion University under the direction of Michael L. Nelson. mod_oai is developed under the GNU General Public License (GPL), and is distributed free of charge.
