= Islandora =

Open source digital repository system

- Developer: Islandora Foundation
- Operating system: Cross-platform
- Type: Digital libraries
- License: GPL
- Website: islandora.ca

Islandora is a free and open-source software digital repository system based on Drupal and integrating with additional applications, including Fedora Commons. It is open source software (released under multiple licenses, including the GNU General Public License). Islandora was originally developed at the University of Prince Edward Island by the Robertson Library and is now maintained by the Islandora Foundation, which has a mission to, "promote collaboration through transparency and consensus building among Islandora community members, and to steward their shared vision for digital curation features through a body of software and knowledge."

Islandora may be used to create large, searchable collections of digital assets of any type and is domain-agnostic in terms of the type of content it can steward. It has a highly modular architecture.

== Key Features ==
- Create, manage, and display collections or other compound configurations of any type of file: Images, documents (including PDFs), described audio/video, books/newspapers (and other paged content), and arbitrary file formats (binary files).
- Display and view any file supported in modern browser technology, with integrations for the International Image Interoperability Framework (IIIF) for images, and native integration with Drupal's rich ecosystem of modules for digital exhibit creation.
- Transcode source files for preservation, display, and full text indexing via an optional suite of microservices that enable the system to scale and manage complex media workflows, as well as to move and transform content.
- Preserve content through integration with common standards for persistent identifiers (such as DOI, ARK and Handle), fixity checking, bag-it compliant bags (Archival Information Packages) creation, PRONOM registry linking, reporting for content health. content versioning support, and the creation of robust administrative metadata.
- Create, serialize, export, and expose metadata in any format, with out-of-the box support for a robust MODS use case. In Islandora's current iteration, we have replaced Islandora Legacy (Islandora 7s) form builder with a tighter integration with Drupal's extensive content management system, allowing for better, and more user-friendly manipulation of metadata entry forms and both the transformation and publication of metadata.
- Utilize world-class, highly configurable research index with faceting, simple search, faceted search, browse functions, and the ability to expose metadata through both OAI-PMH and Sparql endpoints.
- Secure content through Drupal's authentication layer, which facilitates the authoring of roles and permissions at multiple layers. Content may be kept dark and exposed to various target groups, and unique workflows can be authored to suit your institution, including the ability to set embargoes (often used for institutional repositories).

Islandora's multiple components are maintained using semantic versioning.

== Usage and backing ==
As of 2020, 331 recorded implementations were noted.

== Bibliography ==
The following Bibliography contains references to material that mentions or discusses Islandora.

=== Journal Articles and Published Conference Proceedings ===
- Adewumi, A., Ikhu-Omoregbe, N. (2011). Institutional Repositories: Features, Architecture, Design and Implementation Technologies. Journal of Computing.
- Barnes, M. E., Ledchumykanthan, N., Pham, K., & Stapelfeldt, K. (2017). Supporting Oral Histories in Islandora. The Code4Lib Journal, 35.
- Castagné, M. (2013). Institutional repository software comparison: DSpace, EPrints, Digital Commons, Islandora and Hydra. doi: 10.14288/1.0075768
- Crowston, K. and Qin, J. (2011). A Capability Maturity Model for Scientific Data Management: Evidence from the Literature. "Proceedings of the American Society for Information Science and Technology", 48(1), 1–9. doi:10.1002/meet.2011.14504801036
- Gourley, D., & Viterbo, P. (2010). A Sustainable Repository Infrastructure for Digital Humanities: The DHO Experience. In M. Ioannides, D. Fellner, A. Georgopoulos, & D. Hadjimitsis (Eds.), Digital Heritage, Lecture Notes in Computer Science (Vol. 6436, pp. 473–481). Springer Berlin / Heidelberg.
- Gucer, K., Janowiecki, M. (2022). From Siloed to Reusable: The Opening of DigitalCollections at Johns Hopkins University. International Journal of Digital Curation, 17. doi: 10.2218/ijdc.v17i1.827
- Hutchinson, T. (2018). Archidora: Integrating Archivematica and Islandora. The Code4Lib Journal, 39.
- Jettka, D. (2014). The HZSK Repository: Implementation, Features, and Use Cases of a Repository for Spoken Language Corpora. ‘’D-Lib Magazine’’. doi: 10.1045/september2014-jettka
- Jones, S., Lampert, C., Lapworth, E., & Shaw S. (2023). Islandora for archival access and discovery. The Code4Lib Journal, 58.
- Kimpton, M., Morris, C. M. (2014). Managing and Archiving Research Data: Local Repository and Cloud-Based Practices. Research Data Management: Practical Strategies for Information Professionals, 223–238.
- King, James. (2010). Building the Pandemic Influenza Digital Archive (PIDA) at the National Institutes of Health Library. Jefferson Digital Commons.
- Krejčíř, V., Strakošová, A., & Adler, J. (2023). From DSpace to Islandora: Why and How. The Code4Lib Journal, 57.
- MacDonald, J. and Yule, D. (2012) Jarrow, Electronic Thesis, and Dissertation Software. The Code4Lib Journal
- Mercer, H., Koenig, J., McGeachin, R. B., & Tucker, S. L. (2011). Structure, Features, and Faculty Content in ARL Member Repositories. Journal of Academic Librarianship, 37(4), 333–342.
- Moore, R. W., Rajasekar, A., Wan, M. (2010). IRODS policy sets as standards for preservation. Roadmap for Digital Preservation Interoperability Framework Workshop, US-DPIF'10. (December 1, 2010). Acm International Conference Proceeding Series.
- Morton-Owens, E. G., Hanson, K. L., & Walls, I. (2011). Implementing Open-Source Software for Three Core Library Functions: A Stage-by-Stage Comparison. Journal of Electronic Resources in Medical Libraries, 8(1), 1–14. doi:10.1080/15424065.2011.551486
- Moses, D., Stapelfeldt, K. (2013). Renewing UPEI’s Institutional Repository: New Features for an Islandora-based Environment. The Code4Lib Journal, 21.
- Paiva, T. S. B., Mello, C. A., Soares, S., & Lima, M. G. Prohist: A Digital Library For Image Processing of Historical Documents.
- Pan, J., Lenhardt, C., Wilson, B., Palanisamy, G., Cook, R., & Shrestha, B. (2011). Geoscience data curation using a digital object model and open-source frameworks: Provenance applications. Geoscience and Remote Sensing Symposium (IGARSS), 2011 IEEE International (pp. 3815 –3818). doi:10.1109/IGARSS.2011.6050062
- Sefton, P., & Dickinson, D. (2011). Repositories post 2010: embracing heterogeneity in AWE, the Academic Working Environment. Journal of Digital Information, 12(2).
- Stapelfeldt, K., & Moses, D. (2013). Islandora and TEI: Current and Emerging Applications/Approaches. Journal of the Text Encoding Initiative. doi: 10.4000/jtei.790
- Stuart, D., Aitken, B., Abbott, D., Chassanoff, A., Hedges, M., & McHugh, A. (2011). Content Models for Enhancement and Sustainability: Creating a Generic Framework for Digital Resources in the Arts and Humanities. In E. García-Barriocanal, Z. Cebeci, M. C. Okur, & A. Öztürk (Eds.), Metadata and Semantic Research, Communications in Computer and Information Science (Vol. 240, pp. 234–244). Springer Berlin Heidelberg.
- Thompson, J., Bainbridge, D., & Suleman, H. (2011). Towards Very Large Scale Digital Library Building in Greenstone Using Parallel Processing. In C. Xing, F. Crestani, & A. Rauber (Eds.), Digital Libraries: For Cultural Heritage, Knowledge Dissemination, and Future Creation, Lecture Notes in Computer Science (Vol. 7008, pp. 331–340). Springer Berlin / Heidelberg.
- Viglianti, R., Barnes, M. E., Ledchumykanthan, N., & Stapelfeldt, K. (2019). Visualizing Fedora-managed TEI and MEI documents within Islandora. The Code4Lib Journal, 44.
- Viterbo, P. B., & Gourley, D. (2010). Digital humanities and digital repositories: sustainable technology for sustainable communications. Proceedings of the 28th ACM International Conference on Design of Communication, SIGDOC ’10 (pp. 109–114). New York, NY, USA: ACM. doi:10.1145/1878450.1878469
- Walters, T. (2014). Assimilating Digital Repositories Into the Active Research Process. Research Data Management: Practical Strategies for Information Professionals, 189–201.
- Walters, T. O. (2009). Data Curation Program Development in U.S. Universities: The Georgia Institute of Technology Example. International Journal of Digital Curation, 4(3), 83–92. doi:10.2218/ijdc.v4i3.116
- Westra, B., Ramirez, M., Parham, S. W., & Scaramozzino, J. M. (2010). Science and Technology Resources on the Internet. Issues in Science and Technology Librarianship, 63.
- Yeh, S. Reyes, F, Rynhart, J., & Bain, P. (2016). Deploying Islandora as a Digital Repository Platform: a Multifaceted Experience at the University of Denver Libraries. D-Lib Magazine. doi: 10.1045/july2016-yeh
- Younglove, A. (2013). Rethinking the Digital Media Library for RIT's The Wallace Center. RIT Scholar Works.

=== Theses, Dissertations, and Coursework ===
- Ishida, M. (2011). Data management in the United States and Canada : academic libraries’ contribution. University of British Columbia, Graduate paper, 2011 Summer Term 1, LIBR 559L School of Library, Archival and Information Studies (SLAIS).
- Lopes, Luis Filipe Vieira da Silva. (2010). A Metadata Model for The Annotation Of Epidemiological Data. Masters Thesis (Dissertation). DOI: http://hdl.handle.net/10455/6698

=== Presentations ===
- Georgiev, A., & Grigorov, A. (2010, December 21). Developing a digital repository infrastructure for sharing digital resources in the teaching education community - Case Study. ShareTEC project to The Fedora UK and Ireland User Group met at the London School of Economics and Political Science (the LSE).
- Humphrey, C. (2010). Bridging data repositories University of Alberta. SPARC Digital Repositories.
- Leggott, M. (2009). Islandora: a Drupal/Fedora Repository System. 4th International Conference on Open Repositories.
- Ruest, N. (2013). The Islandora Web ARChive Solution Pack. Open Repositories 2013
- Zhang, Q. Ishida M. (2011). Research Data Management in Academic Libraries. Unlocking Knowledge Through Open Access.

=== Other ===
- Courtney, N. D. (2010). More Technology for the Rest of Us: A Second Primer on Computing for the Non-IT Librarian. ABC-CLIO.
- Salo, Dorothea. (2010). Retooling libraries for the data challenge.
- Shearer, K. and Argáez, D. (2010) Addressing the Research Data Gap: A Review of Novel Services for Libraries. Canadian Association of Research Libraries (CARL).
- Walters, T., Skinner, K. (2011). New Roles for New times: Digital Curation for Preservation. Report Prepared for the Association of Research Libraries.
