= UKOLN =

Formerly known as The United Kingdom Office for Library and Information Networking, UKOLN was a centre of expertise in digital information management, providing advice and services to the library, information, education and cultural heritage communities. UKOLN was based at the University of Bath and was funded through a mixture of core and project grants. Latterly it received its core funding solely from JISC, but had received core grants previously from the Museums, Libraries and Archives Council and the British Library.

== History ==
UKOLN traces its roots back to 1977, when Maurice Line initiated the Bath University Programme of Catalogue Research with funding from the British Library. This led to the establishment, in 1979, of a research centre under the directorship of Philip Bryant, again with British Library funding. It was known initially as the Centre for Catalogue Research, and later renamed the Centre for Bibliographic Management (CBM) to reflect its broadening research portfolio.

In 1989, the British Library established the UK Office for Library Networking to work alongside the CBM. It had one full-time member of staff. In 1992, it merged with the CBM and started to receive additional core funding from JISC. The combined organisation was known briefly as UKOLN: The Office for Library and Information Networking, but three years later this was simplified to the UK Office for Library and Information Networking. In 2002 it became known simply as UKOLN, again reflecting a shift in the focus of its activity.

In 1994, Lorcan Dempsey succeeded Philip Bryant as Director of UKOLN. He in turn was succeeded in the role by Liz Lyon in 2000.

In May 2013 an article published in the Times Higher Education announced that "16 of its 24 University of Bath-based staff [were made] redundant after the cessation of a £622,000 annual grant from the higher education technology body Jisc".

Although UKOLN continued after 31 July 2013 it was significantly reduced in size and was no longer working in many of the areas which were responsible for its visibility in national and international arenas. UKOLN's Director departed without replacement in late 2013. The remaining staff were made redundant or redeployed in July 2015, marking the cessation of UKOLN's activities.

== Work ==
UKOLN's main work included:

- influencing policy and informing practice;
- promoting community-building and consensus making by actively raising awareness;
- advancing knowledge through research and development;
- building innovative systems and services based on Web technologies;
- acting as an agent for knowledge transfer.

Its specialist areas included metadata, interoperability and digital curation. It was involved in a range of national and international projects including the DELOS Network of Excellence in Digital Libraries, the Development of a European Service for Information on Research and Education (DESIRE), the Digital Repository Infrastructure Vision for European Research (DRIVER, a precursor to OpenAIRE), the Dublin Core Metadata Initiative, the Knowledge and Information Management (KIM) Grand Challenge Project, and the development of the SWORD interoperability standard and the Bath Profile of the Z39.50 standard. It was a founder member of the Digital Curation Centre (DCC) in 2004.

UKOLN published the Ariadne (Web magazine), targeted principally at information science professionals in academia, archives, libraries and museums, and the International Journal of Digital Curation. UKOLN also organised many events, including the annual Institutional Web Management Workshop and the International Digital Curation Conference.
