= Lorcan Dempsey =

Irish librarian and academic (1958-)

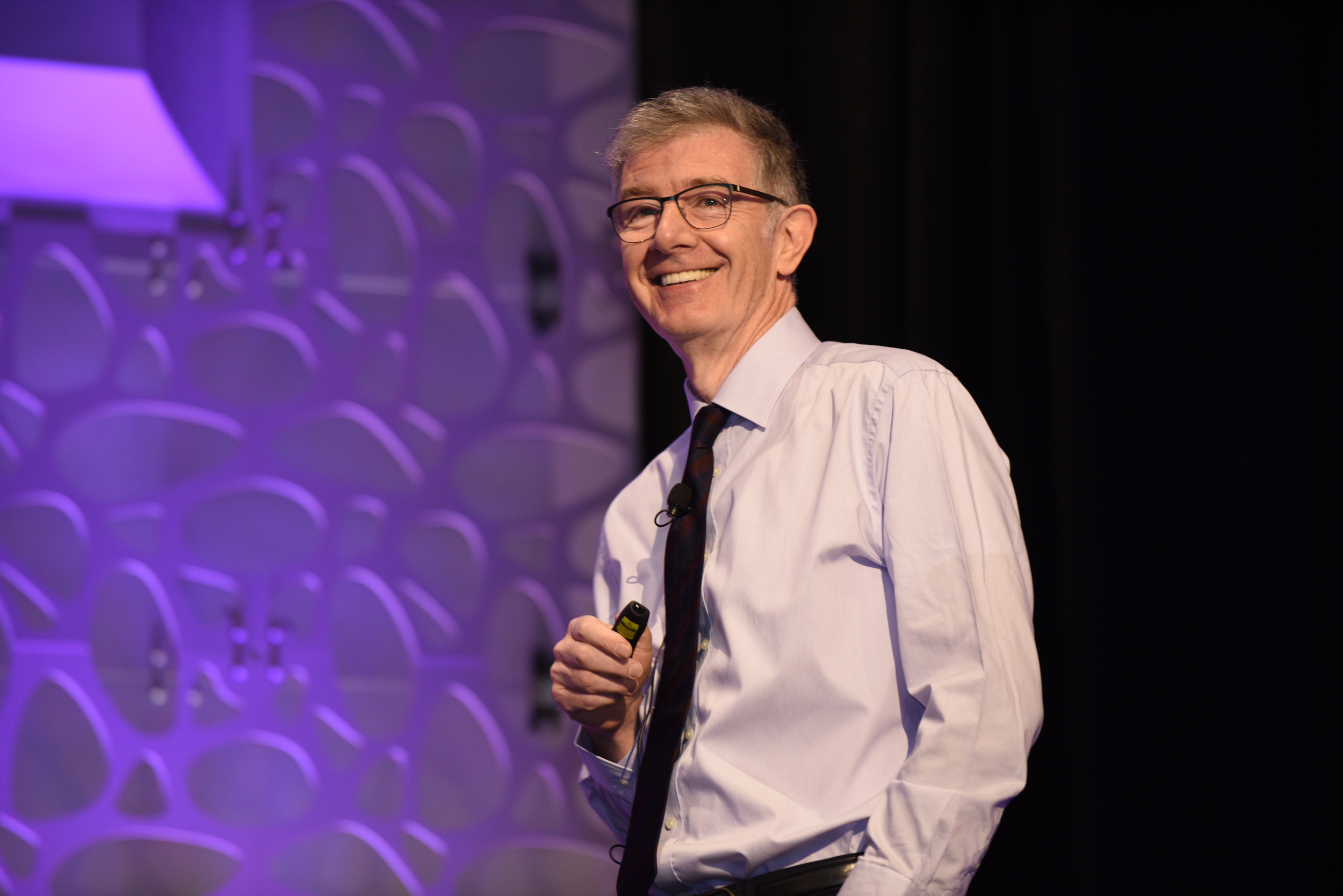
Lorcan Dempsey, Baltimore, 2017

Lorcan Dempsey is a librarian who was a vice president and Chief Strategist of OCLC, where he worked for 21 years between 2001 and 2022. He is currently a professor of practice at the University of Washington Information School.

He is a native of Dublin, Ireland, where he worked for some years in public libraries. He writes and talks about libraries and networked information. He is interested in the impact of changing patterns of research and learning on libraries, in libraries as public institutions, and in the architecture of digital information environments.

== Career ==
Dempsey was appointed director of UKOLN, a research and policy unit at the University of Bath, in 1994.

In May 2000, Dempsey moved to work for the Jisc; part of his assignment involved being Programme Director of the DNER. In 2001 he joined the Online Computer Library Center (OCLC) as vice-president of Research. He was named OCLC Chief Strategist in March 2004.

In January 2022, OCLC announced that Dempsey would retire from his position in April 2022, though he stayed through June.

In August 2022, Dempsey received the IFLA Medal in recognition of his service to the library field.

In August 2023, Dempsey joined the faculty at the University of Washington Information School as Professor of Practice and Distinguished Practitioner in Residence, teaching in its MLIS and undergraduate informatics programs.

== Influence ==
Dempsey maintains a blog aimed at the wider library and digital information sectors, and tweets on similar issues.

A 2007 blog post was responsible for the coining of the term amplified conference. He has introduced many other concepts and terminology into the library community, including the network level; collective collection; disclosure; sourcing and scaling; library logistics; making data work harder; Amazoogle; in the flow; discovery happens elsewhere; inside out and outside in (of collections) and web scale. He introduced the term memory institution into popular use.

Dempsey has written and presented extensively on library issues. His published works cover topics such as the Warwick Framework, libraries in the contemporary world, the evolution of the digital library, and the library catalogue.

== Views on Wikipedia ==
In 2006 he noted the importance of Wikipedia as an addressable knowledge base: Wikipedia makes it easy to include in any online communications a pointer to more knowledge on any topic using a convenient stable URL. "The economy and convenience of doing this is enormous", he said.

Rather than continuing a tedious Wikipedia good/Wikipedia bad conversation, we should recognize the attraction it has as an addressable knowledge base, understand the variety of uses to which it is put, and remind folks of the judgments they need to make depending on those uses.

— Lorcan Dempsey, "Wikipedia again: an addressable knowledge base"

In 2012 he noted: "Wikipedia is already an 'addressable knowledge base', which creates huge value. DBpedia aims to add structure to this. Perhaps more importantly, Wikidata is an initiative to create a machine- and human-readable knowledge base of all the entities in Wikipedia and allow them to be augmented with further data and links."

== Facilitation ==
- Course Director, TICER Summer School, Tilburg University, The Netherlands, 21 to 24 August 2012.
- Principal presenter, Hong Kong University Libraries Leadership Institute, Bangkok, Thailand, 29 April to 3 May 2011.

== Contributions to invitational lecture series ==
- The Research Library: Scalable Efficiency and Scalable Learning. 2012 SLIS David Kaser Lecture Series, Indiana University, Bloomington, Indiana, 7 October 2012.
- Universities, libraries, collections, futures. Miles Conrad Lecture, NFAIS 52nd Annual Conference, Philadelphia. 1 March 2010.
- Discovery, Delivery, Disclosure. University of Minnesota Libraries Planning Speaker Series. Minneapolis, 23 November 2009.
- The Changing Scholarly and Cultural Record. Hall Center for the Humanities, University of Kansas, Lawrence, Kansas. 5 December 2007.
- The Network Rewrites the Library. Phineas L. Windsor Lectureship, UIUC-Graduate School of Library and Information Science, Urbana-Champaign, Illinois. 23 February 2007.
- Libraries and the network platform: A new cooperative context. Inaugural Frederick G. Kilgour Lecture in Information and Library Science, The School of Information and Library Science, UNC, Chapel Hill, North Carolina. 22 February 2006.

== Awards ==
Dempsey is the co-recipient of the 2004 ALCTS presidential citation and the 2010 NFAIS Miles Conrad award. In June 2014, Dempsey was awarded the Honorary Degree of Doctor of the university (DUniv) by The Open University of the UK.

== Personal life ==
Dempsey is married to Ann Lennon, also a librarian. He has two children.
