= NELINET =

Nonprofit organization of libraries

NELINET logo

NELINET, Inc. was an American not-for-profit membership cooperative of academic, public, school and special libraries and other information and cultural organizations in New England (Connecticut, Maine, Massachusetts, New Hampshire, Rhode Island and Vermont). It was formed as a program of the New England Board of Higher Education in 1966, and became independently incorporated in 1979. It merged into Lyrasis in 2009.

NELINET's primary services included member education, technical and general support, and consulting. NELINET was also a regional service provider for OCLC. In addition, NELINET provided regional resources, such as New England Regional Depository, the New England Collections Online, the NELINET Technology Sandbox, and TrendGauge (an information awareness blogging service).

Another activity was to act as a cooperative purchasing agent for electronic resources such as an academic databases, online journals and e-books. Since NELINET had over 600 member libraries that included many of the strongest academic library programs in the United States, its combined buying power was substantial.

The mission of NELINET was to collaborate with its member libraries, and with other regional, national and international partners, to create opportunities for connections, collaboration, and cooperation among members to shape the future of New England libraries, museums, historical societies, and other related information organizations in the evolving information environment. NELINET was a multitype library cooperative, including academic, public, school, corporate, and special (including medical, law, and theological). The governing Board of Directors was elected by and from the membership.

Nelinet also sponsored an information technology conference annually in the New England area, sponsoring topics of general IT interest to libraries. Topics included library-related items, such as open source projects, with leaders in the fields giving presentations.

NELINET was based in Southborough, Massachusetts (a suburb of Boston).

== History ==
NELINET roots began in 1955 when the New England Board of Higher Education (NEBHI) was established by the six New England states (Connecticut, Maine, Massachusetts, New Hampshire, Rhode Island and Vermont) to achieve foster inter-institutional cooperation. In the early 1960s, NEBHI began to recognize that a significant potential might exist for inter-library cooperation. On April 28, 1964, a meeting of the six state land grant university libraries was held at which they agreed that cooperative ventures in technical services such as using a computer to control acquisitions.

On August 15, 1966, the Council on Library Resources (CLR) awarded NEBHI a grant to design a regional cataloging and processing center for New England. Within a month, the first progress report on creating a technical processing center was written. In December 1966, NEBHI requested and the Council of Library Resources later awarded another grant to develop a pilot project for a regional processing center. In October 1967, the name New England Library Information Network (NELINET) was adopted. The first test of the processing center using records derived from MARC tapes was a remote site, the University of New Hampshire library, occurred in December 1967. It was also in July of that year that OCLC, the Ohio College Library Center, legally incorporated.

The first full-time director of NELINET was hired in 1968: Samuel Goldstein from the University of Massachusetts. In January 1971, Ronald Miller succeeded him as director. At that time, membership categories were established, and in the summer of 1971 the NELINET membership increased to 21 libraries. On October 6, 1971, an agreement was reached between NELINET and another new technical processing organization, OCLC, to see if the OCLC system could be replicated at NELINET. However, instead, in November, NELINET received a CLR grant for a 15-week simulation of the OCLC system and a six-month test of the system to be done at Dartmouth College, while developments of the NELINET system continued. As a result of these tests, in April 1972 the NELINET board of directors unanimously resolved to commit NELINET to work towards the implementation of the OCLC system in New England. Public libraries started joining NELINET in 1972, the first being the Ferguson Library of Stamford, Connecticut. By September 1974, a NELINET member, Northeastern University, cataloged the one-millionth book in the OCLC system.

By May 1975, NELINET was second only to Ohio in the use of the OCLC system. In 1977, John Linford replaced Ron Miller as Director and brought a new perspective to NELINET. By 1978, NELINET matured to a point where some change in the relationship with NEBHI was inevitable. On January 13, 1978, plans developed for the possible separation of NELINET from NEBHI. This resulted in NELINET filing for incorporation in 1978 (eleven years after OCLC had done so). In 1982, Laima Mockus became the Executive Director. Marshall Keys became the Executive Director in 1989, and in 1999 Arnold Hirshon became the new Executive Director.

In 2008, Nelinet began a large project to incorporate Open Source Hosting (Now known as SAAS) for libraries and began a hosted library checkin/out system using a system called Evergreen, running at the Nelinet offices, with other library applications to follow. Beta testing of this new service was done with cooperation of a group of libraries in Vermont. Talks were also in progress to expand the service to the NH Library Systems. A colocation facility in Sommerville was selected and work began to move the hosted systems to the facility.

In October, 2009, NELINET joined Lyrasis, which was formed from the merger of PALINET and SOLINET. The plan was to make the Southboro office the technical center of the company due to the new colocation facility and the Open Source Hosting services. At this time, NELINET was to move to a smaller space in Southborough, as the employee count was already down to less than 16. These plans fell through and layoffs began to occur and the new office space was cancelled. The local office in Southborough, MA was closed in June 2010 with a handful of workers from the office 'working at home'. As of September 2011, most had been laid off.
