= Bibliographical Center for Research =

Bibliographical Center for Research (BCR) was a regional cooperative libraries network established in 1935, headquartered in Aurora, Colorado, and active through 2010.

BCR members included over 9000 libraries in an 11-state region of the western United States: Alaska, Colorado, Idaho, Iowa, Kansas, Montana, Nevada, Oregon, Utah, Washington, and Wyoming.

Before its merger with Lyrasis, BCR was the nation's oldest multi-state library cooperative, with services including assisting researchers and libraries with locating materials outside their local community, catalog creation, consulting, product and service discounts, and computer systems training. BCR also offered OCLC products and services. BCR membership was funded by state library agencies, offering statewide membership on behalf of all libraries in their states.

The nonprofit organization's records have been deposited at the University of Denver archives.
