= John Wilkin =

American librarian

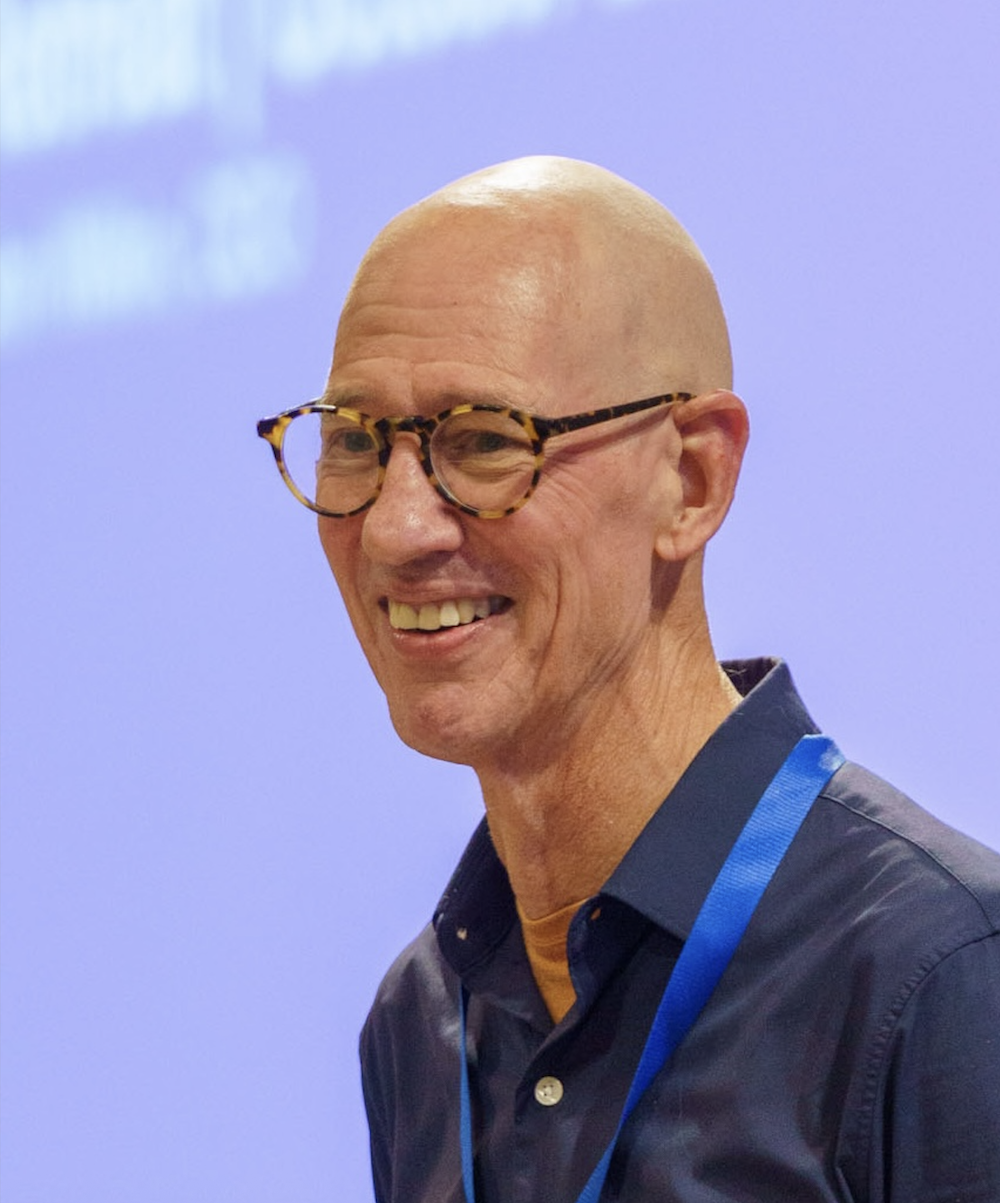
- Born: 1956 (age 69–70)
- Education: Antioch College (BA); University of Virginia (MA); University of Tennessee Knoxville (MLS)
- Occupation: Librarian
- Employer: Lyrasis

John Price Wilkin (born 1956) is an American librarian whose work has primarily been in development of digital library technologies and research library management. He has previously served as the Executive Director of HathiTrust and as the Juanita J. and Robert E. Simpson Dean of Libraries and University Librarian at the University of Illinois Urbana-Champaign. Wilkin is currently the Chief Executive Officer of Lyrasis.

== Education ==
Wilkin received his BA in English and Education from Antioch College (1979), his MA in English from the University of Virginia (1980), and his MLS from the University of Tennessee at Knoxville (1986).

== Career ==
After an initial career as a high school English teacher in California, Ohio, Kentucky, and Virginia's Shenandoah Valley, Wilkin began work in research libraries, first through the Research Library Residency Program at the University of Michigan. His early jobs included working as the Data Services Librarian at the University of Michigan, where he developed a service (UMLibText) that made SGML-encoded text available to the campus through pre-web technologies, and then at the University of Virginia where he directed the development of web-based digital technologies (1992–1994). He established the Humanities Text Initiative at the University of Michigan in 1994. In 1996, he was appointed the first director of the Digital Library Production Service, where he led in the development of online text and journal initiatives, including supporting the creation of the Making of America.

In 2002, Wilkin was appointed Associate University Librarian for Library Information Technology at the University of Michigan. He led Michigan in its creation of and participation in the Google Books Library Project, and served as interim co-director of the Library in 2006-2007. In 2012, he was also appointed Associate University Librarian for Publishing, overseeing MPublishing, which had previously incorporated the Scholarly Publishing Office and the University of Michigan Press. He played a central role in creating HathiTrust in 2008 and served as the founding Executive Director (later CEO) of HathiTrust until 2013.

Wilkin assumed the position of Dean of Libraries and University Librarian at the University of Illinois in 2013. In addition, he served as Interim Vice Chancellor for Academic Affairs and Provost Designate at Illinois from February 2017 through January 2018.

In October 2022, Wilkin was named CEO of Lyrasis, effective December 1.

== Awards ==
- 2011 LITA/Library Hi Tech award for Outstanding Communication in Library and Information Technology
- 2019 Hugh Atkinson Memorial Award from the American Library Association
