= Lyrasis =

Non-profit membership organization for libraries, archives and museums

- Formation: April 2009; 17 years ago
- Merger of: NELINET, PALINET, SOLINET
- Type: Nonprofit
- Tax ID no.: 23-1365979
- Location: Alpharetta, Georgia, US
- Fields: Library and cultural heritage
- CEO: John Wilkin
- R.O.R. Id: ror.org/026tem613
- Revenue: US$139 million (2025)
- Website: lyrasis.org

Lyrasis is a nonprofit membership organization that serves and supports libraries, archives, museums, and cultural heritage and research organizations globally. Formed in 2009 from the merger of library networks, Lyrasis is based in the United States.

== Overview ==
Lyrasis is a 501(c)(3) nonprofit membership organization headquartered in Alpharetta, Georgia, and legally incorporated in Pennsylvania. According to its mission statement, "Lyrasis empowers libraries, archives and museums through content services, open technologies and community-based solutions that expand access to information, preserve cultural heritage, and advance the shared goals of our members and the communities we serve." The name "Lyrasis" is a portmanteau of the constellation Lyra and the suffix "sis," meaning "a process of change."

As of 2025, Lyrasis has more than 1,000 institutional and group members located throughout the United States and employs about 100 staff. The organization has three main areas of focus: content and scholarly communications, hosting and open source software support, and ebooks and community engagement. Lyrasis also offers consulting services and professional development classes. Members of Lyrasis include academic, public, special, school, and state libraries, as well as archives and museums. Lyrasis is governed by a board of directors, which ensures mission alignment, guides strategy, and oversees the CEO. The board consists of 12-15 voting directors, 6-8 of whom are elected by the membership; the other directors are appointed by the board.

Since 2014, Lyrasis has supported open source software programs for the benefit of the library, museum, archives, and research communities. Lyrasis serves as the organizational home for CollectionSpace, ArchivesSpace, Fedora, DSpace, and VIVO, providing fiscal sponsorship and program services. Since 2018, Lyrasis has led the ORCID US community of practice, which Lyrasis established in partnership with the Greater Western Library Alliance, the Big Ten Academic Alliance, and NERL.

== History ==
Lyrasis was formed in April 2009 from the merger of SOLINET and PALINET, two US-based library networks in the South and Mid-Atlantic regions. PALINET's history dated back to 1933 and the launch of an initiative to create a library union catalog across several Philadelphia-area academic libraries. NELINET, a New England library network, also merged into Lyrasis in late 2009. In January 2011, the Bibliographical Center for Research based in Colorado phased out operations and merged into Lyrasis.

Kate Nevins served as executive director of Lyrasis from 2009 until her retirement in 2015. Robert Miller assumed the role of chief executive officer in June 2015, serving through June 2022. Erin Tripp, former CEO of DuraSpace, served as interim CEO. John Wilkin, dean of libraries at the University of Illinois Urbana-Champaign, became CEO effective December 1, 2022.

In January 2019 Lyrasis and DuraSpace announced their intention to merge. This was the second time the two organizations had planned a merger. The merger was finalized in July 2019. In 2021, Lyrasis acquired Bibliolabs, which expanded its ebook and community engagement work to include Biblioboard and the Indie Author Project. In 2020, supported with funding from the Knight Foundation, Lyrasis partnered with the Digital Public Library of America (DPLA) to pursue the Palace Project. Based on the SimplyE application developed by New York Public Library and its partners, Palace is an ebook and eaudiobook reading application and library marketplace, launched in 2022. Lyrasis fully acquired Palace from the DPLA in 2025. In 2023, the Westchester Academic Library Directors Organization (WALDO) phased out operations and entrusted Lyrasis with its content licensing portfolio.
