= Mercury (metadata search system) =

Metadata management, data discovery and access system

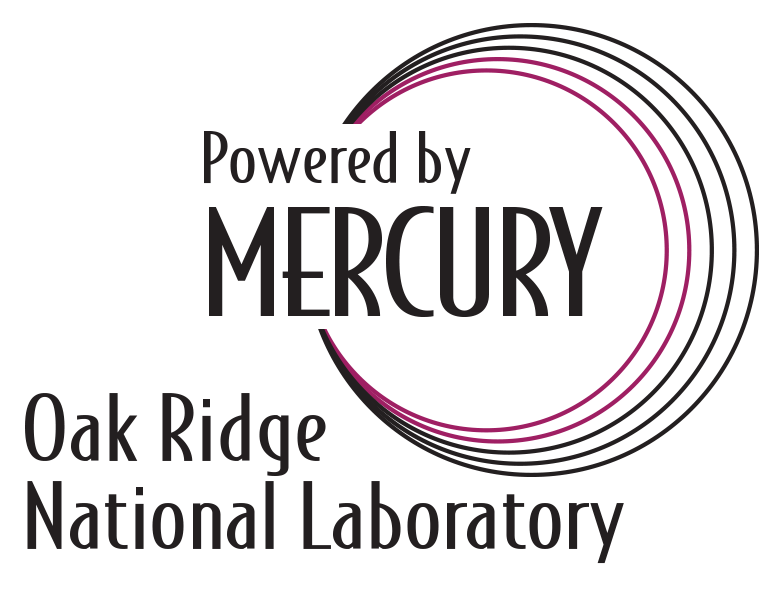
Mercury Metadata Search System

Mercury is a distributed metadata management, data discovery and access system. It is a scientific data search system to capture and manage biogeochemical and ecological data in support of the Earth science programs funded by the United States Department of Energy (DOE) and United States Geological Survey (USGS) - Department of Interior (DOI). Mercury was originally developed for NASA, but the consortium is now supported by USGS and the DOE. Ongoing development of Mercury is done through an informal consortium at Oak Ridge National Laboratory.

Mercury is a part of the Oak Ridge National Laboratory Environmental Sciences Division (ESD) and a contributor to the Climate Change Science Institute (CCSI).

== Technical features ==
Mercury supports data archiving, data discovery through various search strategies (text string, fielded, spatial, temporal), data reuse, and longer-term scientific digital data stewardship, and supports a range of recognized data exchange and interoperability protocols and supports various metadata standards including XML, Z39.50, FGDC, Dublin Core, Darwin Core, Ecological Metadata Language, and ISO. Mercury also uses OAI-PMH to index metadata records from Global Change Master Directory (GCMD) and redistribute them other data providers.
