= Ariadne (web magazine) =

UK library science periodical (1996-)

- Editor: Jon Knight
- Categories: Library and information science
- Publisher: Loughborough University
- First issue: January 1996
- Country: UK
- Website: http://www.ariadne.ac.uk/
- ISSN: 1361-3200
- OCLC: 35952134

Ariadne is a web magazine, 71 issues of which were published by UKOLN from January 1996 until the cessation of JISC funding to that organisation in July 2013. The Library of the University of Bath took over publishing until February 2015, producing two more issues. From March 2015, Loughborough University produces and hosts issues. An editorial board, consisting of librarians, practitioners and academics from several universities, as well as relevant subject specialists, procures and reviews content.

Ariadne was created originally as a project funded under the UK Electronic Libraries Programme (eLib), and covered topics such as information service developments and networking issues, particularly as they related to the United Kingdom. In later years, it also covered JISC-funded programmes and services, as well as developments in museums, libraries and archives worldwide.

From issue 74 onwards, Ariadne articles are largely practice-oriented i.e. written by practitioners involved with libraries, museums or archives detailing something that they've done in one of those places that is of interest to people working in the same field elsewhere.
