= Digital Repository of Ireland =

- Taisclann Dhigiteach na hÉireann
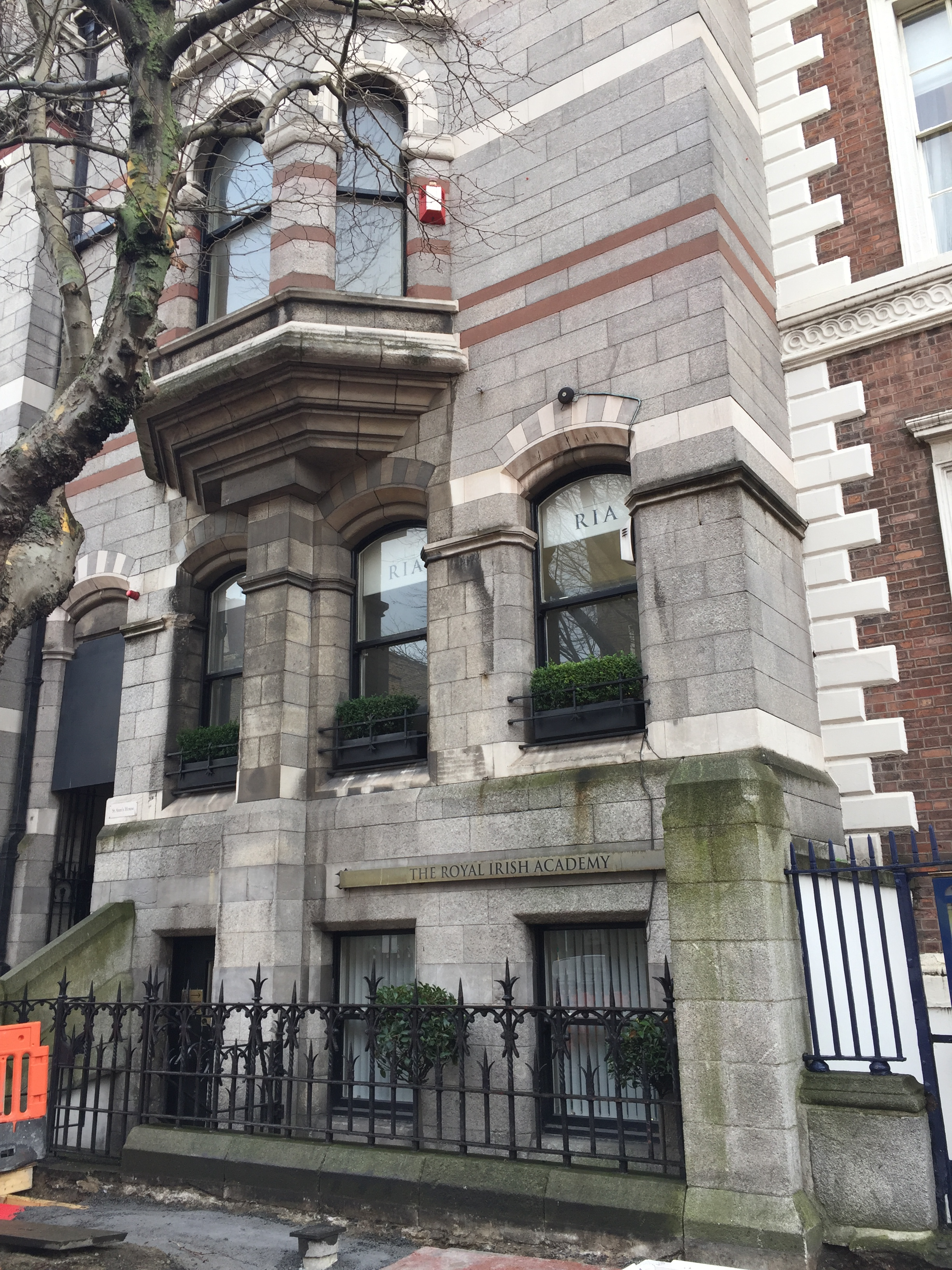
- The Digital Repository of Ireland is housed in the Royal Irish Academy

Agency overview
- Formed: June 24, 2015
- Jurisdiction: Ireland
- Headquarters: 19 Dawson Street Dublin 2
- Employees: 15
- Agency executive: Natalie Harrower, Director
- Website: https://dri.ie/

The Digital Repository of Ireland (DRI) is a digital repository for Ireland's humanities, social science and cultural heritage data. It was designed as an open access infrastructure that allows for interactive use and sustained growth. Three institutions, Royal Irish Academy (RIA), Trinity College Dublin (TCD), and Maynooth (now Maynooth University or MU), currently manage the repository and implement its policies, guidelines and training. The Department of Education and Skills has primarily funded DRI since 2016 through the Higher Education Authority and the Irish Research Council. As of 2018, DRI is home to over 28,000 items.

== History ==
The DRI was established in 2011 after receiving €5.2 million in funding through the Irish government's Higher Education Authority. The Programme for Research in Third Level Institutions (PRTLI) would support the project for four years. Launched on 24 June 2015 at Croke Park, DRI began as a consortium of six Irish academic institutions: Royal Irish Academy (RIA), National University of Ireland, Maynooth (now Maynooth University or MU), Trinity College Dublin (TCD), Dublin Institute of Technology (DIT), National University of Ireland, Galway (NUIG), and National College of Art and Design (NCAD). It earned the Data Seal of Approval as a Trusted Digital Repository (TDR) in 2015. In 2018, it was awarded the Core Trust Seal, superseding previous certification. DRI became a member of the Research Data Alliance in August 2018.

== Organization ==
The governing body for DRI is a management board which is composed of representatives of each of the academic institutions, who serve three-year terms. The Core Implementation Team (CIT) is responsible for the day-to-day running of the Repository as well as strategy development, coordination and project delivery. The CIT is composed of the DRI Director, DRI Principal Investigators and Institutional representatives, and the DRI Programme Manager in RIA. In addition, an International Advisory Group of eight experts ensures DRI maintains ties with other digital repositories across the globe. The International Advisory Group meets annually to provide oversight and feedback and sustain best practices.

DRI staff is composed of professionals from diverse backgrounds such as librarians, digital archivists, educators, and software engineers who support all aspects of governance, operations and management, and taskforces. As of 2018, there are fifteen full-time staff members.

The DRI has three main areas of focus: Technology, Policy, and Education and Outreach. The technological software protects and preserves the data while allowing easy searching and navigation through the material. Development of policy protocols for data generation and preparation for archiving is a core remit of DRI. Education and Outreach include a training programme and direct contact with the public through workshops and newsletters.

== Collections ==
=== Types ===
DRI Collections cover historical and contemporary Irish cultural heritage. These may contain many different types of digital assets including but not limited to images, audio, and text. While some collections are aggregated from partners and members from heritage and research institutions across the country, users are invited to become depositors to enrich DRI's portrait of Ireland. Collection highlights include Letters of 1916, the Stained Glass Studios Archive, and multi-media content from Raidió Teilifís Éireann.

=== Access ===
As an interactive repository, DRI is open to any kind of user with an interest in Irish cultural heritage regardless of age or level of education. Access, including viewing and uploading collections, is free. However, registration may be required for access to restricted collections with sensitive materials.

Users who wish to add to DRI collections may do so following the six steps to deposit content. Guides, Training Series, and helpdesks are available for more in-depth questions. While the digital surrogates are stored with DRI, the original creator retain ownership, copyright, and associated intellectual property rights. Content will be returned to the creator should DRI cease to exist. Creators can always update their collections by adding new content or improving the metadata. Access restrictions can also be set by the creator.

==== Membership ====
Subscription based membership had been a goal since DRI's inception and was launched in February 2018. Institutions and organizations holding humanities and/or social sciences data, including those operating on a non-funded, voluntary basis, may apply for Full or Associate Membership to leverage DRI's digital stewardship experience and capabilities. Membership benefits also include a collaborative network, training and personal development, online publication and sharing of collections.

== Projects ==
DRI has been involved with many projects since inception.

- DECIPHER / Storyscope - Launched January 2013
- Linked Logainm: Location LODer - Launched September 2013
- The DRI-INSIGHT RTÉ project - Launched September 2013
- Irish Record Linkage, 1864-1913 - Launched December 2013
- The Social Repository of Ireland - Launched January 2014
- PLoT - Launched February 2014
- Inspiring Ireland - Launched March 2014 - won overall award, open source award, and the promoting Ireland award at the eGovernment Awards at Dublin Castle in 2015
- MoTIF Project - Launched May 2014
- DAH Programme - Launched 2014
- CMC LINE-UP Platform: Linked Irish New Music Platform - Launched January 2015
- Research Data Alliance H2020 Project - Launched September 2015
- Inspiring Ireland 1916 - Launched January 2016
- Frongoch and 1916 - Launched December 2016
- Atlantic Philanthropies Active Curation Project - Launched August 2017
- Research Data Alliance - Launched March 2018
- Europeana Common Culture - Launched January 2019
- Europeana Sport: Ireland's Storiest - Launched May 2020
- Archiving Reproductive Health - Launched June 2020
- RDA4EOSC - Launched November 2020
- EnrichEuropeana - Launched April 2021
- Ordnance Survey (OS200) - Launched August 2021
- European Open Science Cloud - Launched February 2022
- WorldFAIR - Launched June 2022
- European Open Science Cloud - Launched February 2026
- DRI Labs - Launched March 2026

== Research Support ==
The Digital Repository of Ireland engages in supporting a range of digital preservation projects. Some of these projects include...

- A Digital Archive of Ireland's Ordnance Survey
- Digital Preservation of Reproductive Health Resources: Archiving Reproductive Health
- Amplifying Change: A History of the Atlantic Philanthropies on the Island of Ireland
- Europeana
- Research Data Alliance

Since 2022, the Digital Repository of Ireland has been the coordinating body for the National Open Research Forum (NORF). The main objective of NORF is to encourage open research, this includes supporting, promoting and bettering the support for open research in Ireland.

== Other Services ==
The Digital Repository of Ireland provides other services and outreach to supplement the collections.

=== Blog ===
DRI Staff and scholars utilizing the collections post articles on the DRI Blog regarding news and updates in the field or specific to DRI. Posts also highlight stories from the collections and new additions.

=== Events ===
Through the DRI Events Calendar, users are invited to attend an array of events hosted by the DRI and its academic partners. Events include repository conferences, lectures and workshops on technical applications or trending library and archive topics. DRI also hosts seminars as part of the DRI Training Series to educate users on using the DRI platform as well as best practices for developing collections and using metadata.

=== Social media ===
The DRI has several social media platforms for users to engage in. DRI joined Bluesky in January 2025 and actively updates its account along with the DRI Facebook page.

Users can also access content such as community forums, presentations, and DRI Training Series via the DRI Vimeo page or the DRI Slideshare page.

== Architecture and Structure ==
=== Infrastructure ===
The platform was built from scratch using many open source platforms, utilizing the best of each and customizing them to implement DRI requirements without having to worry about sustaining and adapting legacy systems or methodologies. The implemented open source systems include OpenNebula, Fedora Commons, Samvera (formerly known as Hydra), Apache Solr, Blacklight, Shibboleth, Ceph, and Ansible. This new structure's framework was influenced by the Open Archival Information System (OAIS) reference model, while the Model-View-Controller (MVC) pattern implemented the data presentation and representation. The infrastructure has been replicated and is maintained at a secondary site in case of failure or disaster recovery.

=== Storage ===
DRI's digital asset preservation, storage, and access requires scalability as the repository's collections continue to grow. DRI utilizes technologies like Ceph and Bareos to provide federated storage and preservation while a separate process maintains integrity and fixity of archival data. The central management system governs storage, management, and migration. DRI's disaster management plan includes storage distribution across multiple servers in multiple geographic locations.
