= OPUS (software) =

Software used to create open access repositories

- Original author: University of Stuttgart Library
- Developer: Cooperative Library Network Berlin-Brandenburg (Q21008407)
- Stable release: 4.10 / 12 May 2026; 7 days ago
- Written in: PHP, XSLT, JavaScript
- Operating system: Cross-platform
- Type: Institutional repository software
- License: GPL
- Website: www.opus-repository.org
- Repository: github.com/OPUS4/application

OPUS is an open-source software package under the GNU General Public License used for creating Open Access repositories that are compliant with the Open Archives Initiative Protocol for Metadata Harvesting. It provides tools for creating collections of digital resources, as well as for their storage and dissemination. It is usually used at universities, libraries and research institutes as a platform for institutional repositories.

== History ==
OPUS, originally an acronym for the Online Publikationsverbund der Universität Stuttgart, was developed with the support of the Deutsches Forschungsnetz (DFN) in 1997 and 1998 at the University of Stuttgart Library. OPUS is used at many universities and library networks. The Library Service Centre for Baden-Württemberg (BSZ) took over development from University of Stuttgart Library, however, since December 2010, the Cooperative Library Network of Berlin-Brandenburg (KOBV) has taken over the development and management of the project at the Zuse Institute Berlin (ZIB).

In Germany, the OPUS software is the most commonly used for the operation of open access repositories (according to a survey carried out in 2012, 77 repositories were based on OPUS). OPUS-based repositories may either be hosted and operated by universities on their own, or as part of hosting services provided by the German library network. The KOBV provides hosting for more than 35 instances of OPUS. Apart from Germany, OPUS is also used in Serbia by two research institutes.

== Development ==
The current version, OPUS 4, is being developed by the Cooperative Library Network Berlin-Brandenburg (KOBV) at the Zuse Institute Berlin (ZIB). The earlier development was coordinated by the Library Service Centre for Baden-Württemberg (BSZ) and the Stuttgart University Library.

Major partners have included the Saxon State and University Library Dresden (SLUB), Bielefeld University Library, Saarland University and State Library Saarbrücken (SULB), University Library of the Hamburg University of Technology (TUHH), Cooperative Library Network Berlin-Brandenburg (KOBV) and University Library Centre of North Rhine-Westphalia (HBZ).

== Technology ==
OPUS 3.x was written in PHP 4. The current version, OPUS 4, is developed in PHP (version 5.3) and is based on the Zend Framework and the search engine Solr. Data are stored in a MySQL database. Both versions are designed for LAMP environments.

== Functionality ==
- OPUS is a simple repository system for various types of objects and formats. These can be deposited, managed and provided with descriptive information (metadata) via a web interface. The objects themselves are not processed on the server side except for full-text search. Metadata can be harvested by different search engines (e.g OAI service providers, Google Scholar, WorldCat).
- OPUS supports Uniform Resource Names (URN) for persistent identification of objects.
- OPUS has a license module; various types of licenses (Digital Peer Publishing, Creative Commons, etc.) can be set up.
- OPUS supports OAI-PMH 2.0 protocol.
- OPUS supports XmetaDiss, the metadata set of the German National Library for online dissertations and post-doctoral theses.
- OPUS supports XmetaDissPlus, the metadata set of the Library Service Center Baden-Württemberg for online dissertations and post-doctoral theses
- OPUS uses checksums to ensure data integrity
