= Code4Lib Journal =

- Discipline: Library and information science
- Language: English

Publication details
- History: 2007–present
- Publisher: Code4Lib (United States)
- Frequency: Quarterly
- Open access: Yes
- License: CC BY

Standard abbreviations
- ISO 4: Code4Lib J.

Indexing
- ISSN: 1940-5758
- LCCN: 2007215720

Links
- Journal homepage

The Code4Lib Journal is a quarterly academic journal published by Code4Lib covering research on libraries and information technology. It was founded by the Code4Lib community in 2007. Code4Lib publishes under a US CC-BY licence. Code4Lib Journal is also open peer-reviewed.

== History ==
The "hacker librarian" culture of the early 2000s led to an active community of library technologists: Code4Lib. In December 2007, the first issue of Code4Lib Journal was published as an experiment to supplement this Code4Lib community. The journal's audience is "generally those working as technologists in libraries. Articles are often of a practical nature, describing coding behind projects and often providing samples of code or project architecture."

The Code4lib Journal was mostly published quarterly until 2020. Due to the pandemic and other social factors it has been published three times each in 2020 and 2021.

== Abstracting and indexing ==
The journal is abstracted and indexed in Library, Information Science & Technology Abstracts.
