= Loafers Bar =

Gay bar in Cork, Ireland

- Interactive map of Loafers Bar
- Address: Douglas Street, Cork, Ireland
- Location: Cork
- Coordinates: 51.89326°N 8.46976°W
- Owner: Derrick Gerety (founder), later Rena Blake, Ted O’Connell
- Type: Gay bar

Construction
- Opened: May 1983; 43 years ago
- Closed: 2015

Loafers Bar, often referred to simply as Loafers, was a gay bar on Douglas Street in Cork, Ireland. Opened in 1983, it became a cultural and social space for the LGBTQ+ community in Cork and, prior to its closure in 2015, it was Ireland's oldest and longest-running gay bar.

== History ==
Loafers was opened in 1983 by Derrick Gerety and his partner Seamus Hogan. Though not initially intended to be a gay bar, it quickly became a welcoming and safe space for LGBTQ people, especially during a time when homosexuality was still criminalised in Ireland (decriminalised in 1993).

Under Gerety’s ownership, the bar became a hub for activism, arts, and social events. After 16 years, the bar was taken over by Rena Blake and later Ted O’Connell.

Loafers became known for its inclusivity and community spirit. It hosted a variety of cultural events and became a support space for LGBTQ+ individuals, particularly during the 1980s and 1990s. Women-only nights were a staple on Thursdays, providing space for lesbian and bisexual women.

== Closure and legacy ==
The bar closed in May 2015, while under the ownership of Ted O’Connell, with economic and personal reasons cited for the decision. Members of the local LGBTQ+ community expressed their sadness at its closure, with some sources describing it a "cornerstone of queer life in Cork". Loafers has been described as being "massively popular" during a period when few such spaces existed in Ireland.

The bar's legacy has been preserved in academic, artistic, and archival work. It is featured in the 2023 documentary film Loafers, directed by Orla Egan, and in the Cork LGBT Archive.

In August 2025, a planning application was reportedly submitted to build apartments on the site.

== See also ==
- LGBT rights in Ireland
