= DuraSpace =

Former U.S. non-profit organization

- Merged into: Lyrasis
- Formation: July 2009
- Dissolved: July 2019; 7 years ago
- Tax ID no.: 26-0389639
- Website: duraspace.org

DuraSpace was a 501(c)(3) not-for-profit organization founded in 2009 with the merger of the Fedora Commons organization and the DSpace Foundation, two of the world's largest providers of open source digital repository software. In 2011, DuraSpace launched DuraCloud, an open source digital preservation software service. In July 2019, DuraSpace merged with Lyrasis, becoming a division of that organization.

== History ==
DuraSpace was founded in 2009 with the merger of the Fedora Commons organization and the DSpace Foundation, two of the world's largest providers of open source digital repository software for managing and providing access to digital content. In July 2019 DuraSpace merged with Lyrasis, becoming a division of that organization.

collaborates with open source software projects, academics, technologists, curators and related commercial partners to create innovative, interoperable technologies and open standards and protocols that share an interest in preserving digital scholarship and culture.

In January 2019 Lyrasis and DuraSpace announced their intention to merge. This was the second time the two organizations had planned a merger. This second attempt was successful, and in July 2019 DuraSpace became a division of Lyrasis with responsibility for community developed software programs.

== Technology ==
The DuraSpace portfolio of open source technologies is developed by librarians, archivists, technologists and researchers. For stewards of knowledge open source software has several important advantages over proprietary software. Open source is developed through free sharing and the transparent exchange of ideas and resources among peers. DSpace and Fedora communities have used this process to build software platforms for repositories in more than 1,500 institutions in over 100 countries. The DuraSpace open technology software portfolio crosses the boundaries of institutional systems, the Web, and cloud infrastructure and provides software solutions that address requirements of both data curation and long-term preservation.

- DSpace is a turn-key application for managing and providing access to digital content in an open access repository most often used as an open access repository for managing faculty and student output.
- Fedora is a modular repository platform for the management and dissemination of digital content in the form of digital objects. Fedora repository software is used by libraries, archives and research projects to preserve and provide specialized types of access to very large and complex aggregations of historic and cultural images, artifacts, text, media, datasets, and documents.
- DuraCloud is a hosted service and open technology launched by DuraSpace in 2011. It uses commercial cloud infrastructure to provide preservation support and access services for libraries, research centers, and other cultural heritage organizations. Columbia University, Massachusetts Institute of Technology, Northwestern University, ICPSR, State Library of North Carolina, and other institutions use DuraCloud to preserve digital resources.
- VIVO is a linked data application for research discovery.

== Supporting organization ==
The DuraSpace organization receives financial support from organizations that use DSpace, Fedora and DuraCloud open source software. DuraSpace does not receive significant funding from government agencies or private foundations. 154 organizations contributed at one of four levels of financial support in years 2017/18 becoming members of DuraSpace.

DuraSpace in turn provides the user community with tools, services, and leadership in support of the ongoing development of open source technologies news and information, publications, education and professional development services, and community mailing lists/forums.

== See also ==
- Digital asset management
- Content management system
- Digital library
- Digital preservation
- Institutional repository
- Open-source software
