= Samvera =

- Operating system: Cross-platform
- Type: Digital libraries
- License: Apache License 2.0
- Website: samvera.org

Samvera, originally known as Hydra, is an open-source digital repository software product. Samvera main components are Fedora Commons, Solr, Blacklight, and HydraHead (a Ruby on Rails plugin and gem, respectively). Each Samvera implementation is called a "head". "Samvera" is Icelandic for "togetherness".

== History ==
The project was launched in September 2008. The software was developed as a collaboration between Stanford University, the University of Virginia, the University of Hull, and Fedora Commons. The stated goal of the project was to "support the rapid development of multiple systems tailored to distinct needs, but powered by a common underlying repository."

In May 2017, the project began discontinuing use of the Hydra name and announced that the "Hydra Project" would become the "Samvera Community."

== Project governance ==
There are three governance bodies. The original collaborators, plus some newer members, form the Samvera Steering Group. That group oversees legal and administrative aspects of the project. A second body is made up of institutional partners. Over two dozen institutions are formal partners. The Samvera developers group is the third group and is made up of contributors to the Samvera software.

== Use ==
Samvera is primarily used in libraries and digital repositories. It was originally developed to make use of metadata defined by the Library of Congress's Metadata Object Description Schema (MODS) standard. Samvera implements the Opinionated Metadata gem to create domain-specific languages out of complex XML standards such as MODS. Other metadata standards, such as Dublin Core and Encoded Archival Description (EAD), are also employed in Samvera implementations.

Samvera allows storage of any type of digital files for the purposes of access and/or digital archiving. It is suited to both large and small collections, and is being used in some cases to allow faculty and researchers to self-deposit their own digital research materials.

The concept of Samvera "heads" is unique to this repository software. Each head is a Ruby on Rails application that provides a user experience and set of specific functionalities to a certain user community using content and metadata (the body, with the content residing in Fedora and the metadata residing in Solr) that may be shared with other such heads. For example, a faculty member may use a certain Samvera head to crop, fine-tune, and submit a set of images that is relevant to their research. A casual user may use a different Samvera head to browse these images without the clutter of all the photo editing and submission capabilities. Finally, a librarian user may access yet another Samvera head to curate an online exhibit of research at their University, using the photographs submitted by the faculty member but employing a special curatorial interface.

Samvera has been modified to meet special needs, such as the development of GeoHydra at Stanford University.

== Derivatives ==
Due to its extensive list of dependencies, Samvera is difficult for smaller institutions to implement. To make this software more feasible for such institutions, the Digital Public Library of America, Stanford University, and DuraSpace partnered on a grant project from the Institute for Museum and Library Services called "Hydra-in-a-box". The goal of this project is to extend the Hydra codebase to "build, bundle, and promote a feature-rich, robust, flexible digital repository that is easy to install, configure, and maintain."

=== Hyku ===
This new repository application for managing cultural heritage content is called Hyku. Hyku reduces barriers to effective asset management and preservation for collections and content types of many kinds, and is supported by an open source community. With funding from the Institute of Museum and Library Services, the collaborative project kicked off in 2015. In 2017, Hyku entered beta, and in February 2019, it was promoted out of Samvera Labs. Ongoing development of Hyku is guided by the Samvera community via the Hyku Interest Group and associated partners. Hyku 3.0 was released in February 2021.

Building on Hyrax, Hyku has a long list of features and distinctions, including:

- Multi-tenancy, or the ability to host multiple repository “slices” within the same application, each with its own users, objects, and look & feel
- Support for the IIIF Image and Presentation APIs
- Support for harvesting metadata and content via ResourceSync
- Rich object viewing using the Universal Viewer
- Two bundled work types: Image Work and Generic Work

There are projects in Samvera Community to develop Hyku repository application further for existing and potential adopters. One of them is Hyku for Consortia funded by the Institute of Museum and Library Services and coordinated by The Pennsylvania Academic Library Consortium, Inc. (PALCI) and Private Academic Library Network of Indiana (PALNI). The project aims to explore, develop, and pilot an open source, multi-tenant, consortial institutional repository (IR). Other one is Advancing Hyku funded by Arcadia, a charitable fund of philanthropists Lisbet Rausing and Peter Baldwin and coordinated by University of Virginia Library, Ubiquity Press and the British Library. Advancing Hyku is a collaborative project to support the growth of open access through institutional repositories, by introducing significant structural improvements and new features to the Samvera Community’s Hyku platform.

=== ScholarWorks ===
ScholarWorks is "a shared institutional repository that collects, preserves, and provides access to scholarship by research communities at The California State University." Powered by Samvera Hyrax. "The Site is controlled and operated from our facilities in and around Long Beach, CA."

== See also ==
- Omeka
