= Amplified conference =

Type of conference

An amplified conference is a conference or similar event in which the talks and discussions at the conference are 'amplified' through use of networked technologies in order to extend the reach of the conference deliberations. The term was originally coined by Lorcan Dempsey in a blog post. The term is now widely used within the academic and research community with Wankel proposing the following definition:

The extension of a physical event (or a series of events) through the use of social media tools for expanding access to (aspects of) the event beyond physical and temporal bounds. Such amplification takes place in the context of intent to make the most of the intellectual content, discussion, networking, and discovery initiated by the event through the process of sharing with co-attendees, colleagues, friends and wider informed publics.

A paper by Haider and others illustrates how amplified conferences are becoming mainstream in a discussion on "how social media have been employed as part of the project, particularly around event amplification".

As described by Guy in the Ariadne ejournal the term is not a prescriptive one, but rather describes a pattern of behaviors which initially took place at IT and Web-oriented conferences once WiFi networks started to become available at conference venues and delegates started to bring with them networked devices such as laptops and, more recently, PDAs and mobile phones.

== Different Approaches to 'Amplification' of Conferences ==
There are a number of ways in which conferences can be amplified through use of networked technologies:

- Amplification of the audiences' voice: Prior to the availability of real time chat technologies at events (whether use of IRC, Twitter, instant messaging clients, etc.) it was only feasible to discuss talks with immediate neighbours, and even then this may be considered rude.
- Amplification of the speaker's talk: The availability of video and audio-conferencing technologies make it possible for a speaker to be heard by an audience which isn't physically present at the conference. Although use of video technologies has been available to support conferences for some time, this has normally been expensive and require use of dedicated video-conferencing technologies. However the availability of lightweight desktop tools make it much easier to deploy such technologies, without even, requiring the involvement of conference organisers.
- Amplification across time: Video and audio technologies can also be used to allow a speaker's talk to be made available after the event, with use of podcasting or videocasting technologies allowing the talks to be easily syndicated to mobile devices as well as accessed on desktop computers.
- Amplification of the speaker's slides: The popularity of global repository services for slides, such as SlideShare, enable the slides used by a speaker to be more easily found, embedded on other Web sites and commented upon, in ways that were not possible when the slides, if made available at all, were only available on a conference Web site.
- Amplification of feedback to the speaker: Micro-blogging technologies, such as Twitter, are being used not only as a discussion channel for conference participants but also as a way of providing real-time feedback to a speaker during a talk. We are also now seeing dedicated microblogging technologies, such as Coveritlive and Scribblelive, being developed which aim to provide more sophisticated 'back channels' for use at conferences.
- Amplification of a conference's collective memory: The popularity of digital cameras and the photographic capabilities of many mobile phones is leading to many photographs being taken at conferences. With such photographs often being uploaded to popular photographic sharing services, such as Flickr, and such collections being made more easy to discover through agreed use of tags, we are seeing amplification of the memories of an event though the sharing of such resources. The ability of such photographic resources to be 'mashed up' with, say, accompanying music, can similarly help to enrich such collective experiences.
- Amplification of the learning: The ability to be able to follow links to resources and discuss the points made by a speaker during a talk can enrich the learning which takes place at an event, as described by Shabajee's article on "'Hot' or Not? Welcome to real-time peer review" published in the Times Higher Education Supplement in May 2003.
- Long term amplification of conference outputs: The availability in a digital format of conference resources, including 'official' resources such as slides, video and audio recordings, etc. which have been made by the conference organisers with the approval of speakers, together with more nebulous resources such as archives of conference back channels, and photographs and unofficial recordings taken at the event may help to provide a more authentic record of an event, which could potentially provide a valuable historical record.

The amplification of conferences can be viewed as an example of how new technologies are altering standard practice. By using these techniques a different type of interaction is created at the conference itself, but also the boundaries around the conference can be seen as permeable, with remote participants engaging in discussion. An amplified conference also provides a considerably altered archive compared with a 'traditional' one. For the latter, the printed proceedings will be the main record, but for an amplified event this record is distributed across many media and takes in a wider range of content types, including the papers, videos of the presentations (for example on YouTube), the slides (e.g. on Slideshare), photos of the event (Flickr), interaction between participants (Twitter), reflections and comments (blogs), etc. The amplified conference represents an example of changing practice in digital scholarship.
