= List of libraries in the Netherlands =

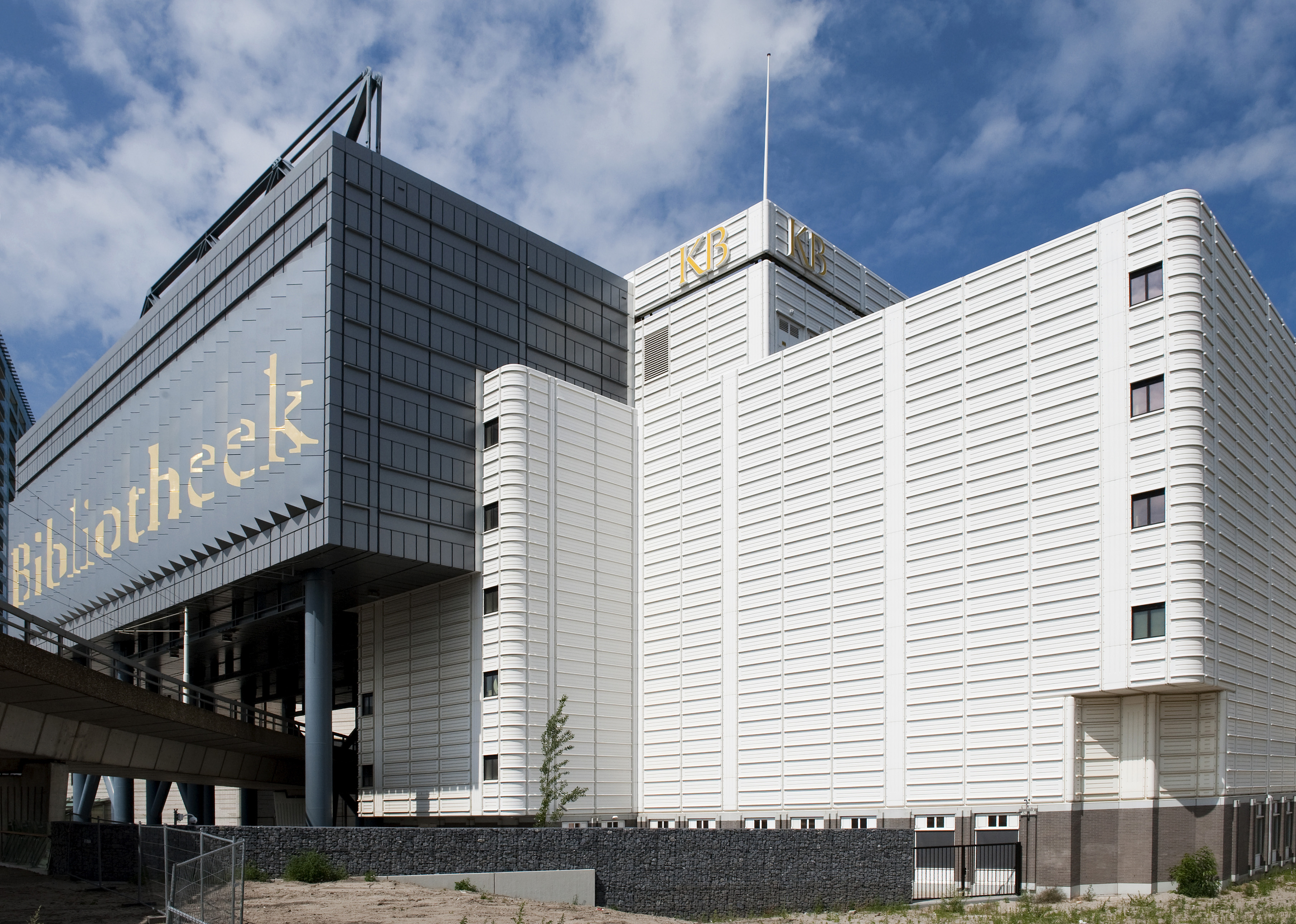
Dutch National Library (The Hague)

This is a list of libraries in the Netherlands. There were about 579 public libraries in the Netherlands in 1997.

== National, regional and state libraries ==
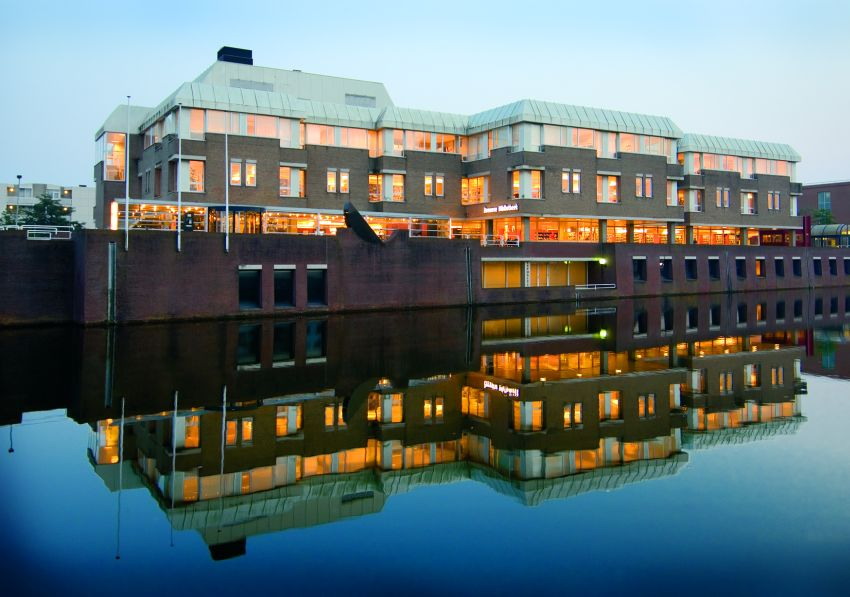
Zeeland Library

- National library of the Netherlands (Koninklijke Bibliotheek), The Hague
- Zeeland Library (Zeeuwse Bibliotheek), the official library of the province of Zeeland

== Municipal libraries ==
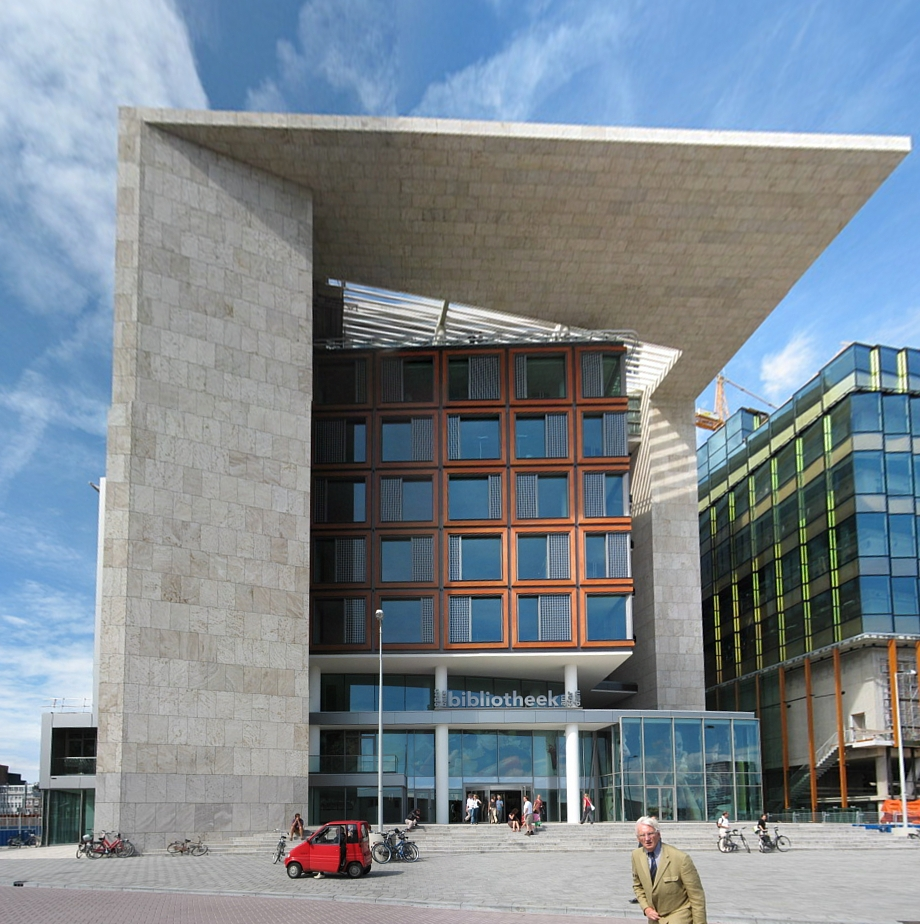
Amsterdam Public Library (OBA)

- Openbare Bibliotheek Amsterdam, the largest public library system in the Netherlands
- Stadsbibliotheek Haarlem, the public library system of Haarlem

== Specialized libraries ==
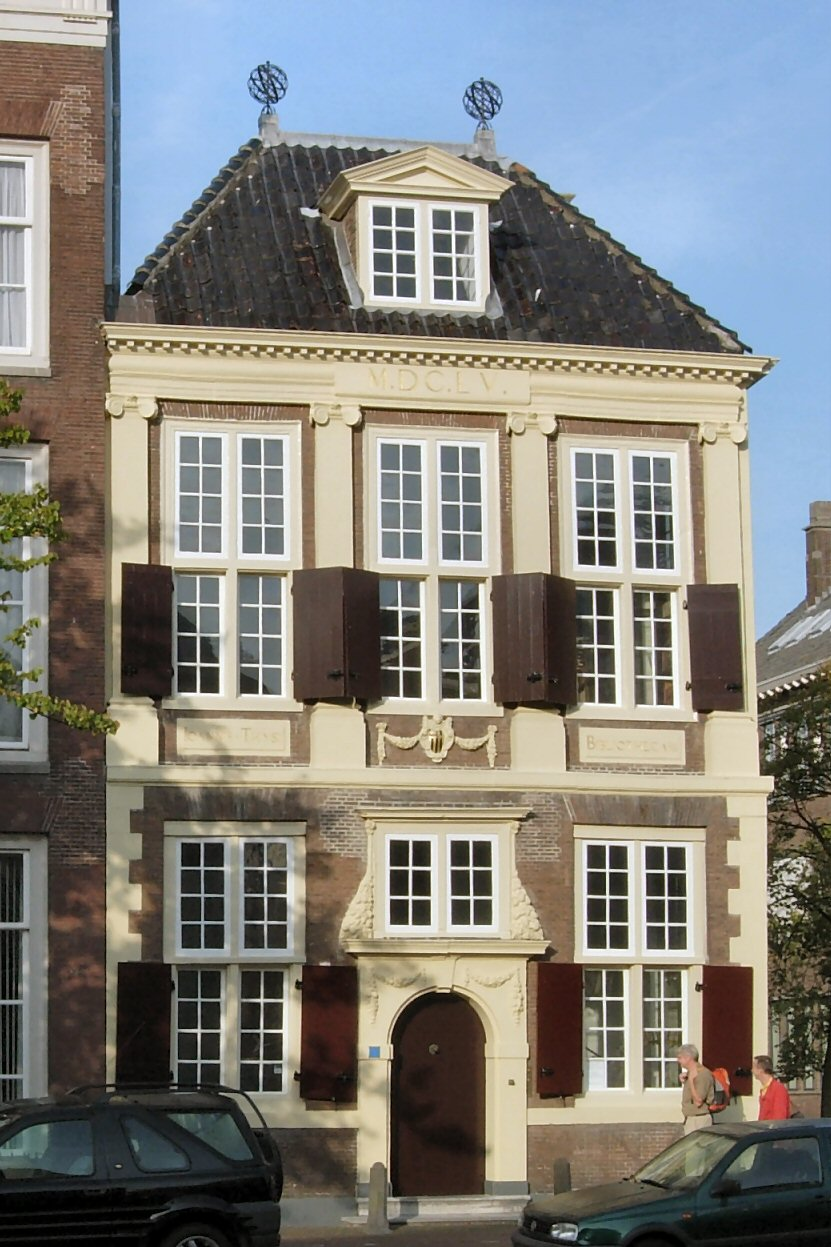
Bibliotheca Thysiana, a library in Leiden from the 17th century

- Afrika-Studiecentrum library, African library and archive, Leiden
- American Library in Middelburg.
- Artis Library, natural history library, Amsterdam
- Atria Institute on gender equality and women's history, public library and research institute dedicated to research and policy advice on gender equality and to the documentation and archival of women's history, Amsterdam
- Bibliotheca Klossiana, oldest library on Freemasonry in the world, The Hague
- Bibliotheca Philosophica Hermetica, a private library on hermeticism, Amsterdam
- Bibliotheca Rosenthaliana, Jewish cultural and historical collection, Amsterdam
- Bibliotheca Thysiana, 17th century library in Leiden
- Cuypers Library, the largest and oldest art historical library in the Netherlands with a 19th-century reading room, Rijksmuseum Research Library, Amsterdam, Rijksmuseum Research Library, the library of the Rijksmuseum, Amsterdam
- Digital Library for Dutch Literature, The Hague
- Hector Hodler Library, one of the largest Esperanto libraries, Rotterdam
- IHLIA LGBT Heritage, international archive and documentation center on homosexuality, bisexuality and transgender, Amsterdam
- KNBF Bondsbibliotheek, a philatelic library in Houten, near Utrecht
- Maastricht University Special Collections, the heritage library of Maastricht University
- Muziekbibliotheek van de Omroep, library of the Music Broadcasting Center, Hilversum
- Netherlands Institute for Art History (Nederlands Instituut voor Kunstgeschiedenis), largest art history centre in the world, The Hague
- Peace Palace Library, one of the oldest libraries dedicated to international law, The Hague
- Tresoar, Frisian History and Literature Center, Leeuwarden
- Zuid-Afrikahuis library, South African library and archive, Amsterdam

== University libraries ==
- Amsterdam University Library, University of Amsterdam
- Leiden University Library, Leiden University
- Radboud University Library, Nijmegen
- University of Groningen Library
- Utrecht University Library

== See also ==
- Books in the Netherlands
- Library associations in the Netherlands
- Open access in the Netherlands
- NARCIS, Netherlands research portal
