= VSNU Elsevier Contract 2020 2024 =

The VSNU Elsevier contract is a legal agreement between Dutch research organisations and the scientific publishers Elsevier. Lasting from 2020 - 2024, the agreement has been portrayed as a significant shift in scholarly publishing, offering individual researchers at Dutch universities unlimited right to freely publish articles (known as Gold Open Access) in Elsevier journals. While informally known as the VSNU contract, it is signed on behalf of a number of umbrella organisations for research in the Netherlands - the Association of Universities in the Netherlands (VSNU), the Netherlands Federation of University Medical Centres (NFU) and the Dutch Research Council (NWO). The Dutch ICT organisation SURF acted as legal signatories for the contract.

== Read and Publish Deal ==
Traditional agreements between research organisations and scientific publishers gave the research organisations the right to access scientific articles and databases owned or managed by the publisher. However, the advent of Open Access has led to 'transformative agreements', of which this contract is one example. Transformative Agreements (otherwise known as Read and Publish, or Publish and Read contracts) concern not only open access by researchers to paywalled articles, but also allow researchers to publish their scholarly articles under Open Access conditions, ie freely available on the Internet.

The VSNU - Elsevier contract provides Dutch research organisations with read access to all its journals. For publication, nearly all journals in the Elsevier stable are included. However, the permission for researchers to publish articles in journals related to Cell or The Lancet is still to be negotiated. From the start of the contract in 2020 to mid-2021, 97% of Elsevier articles published via Dutch research organisations were open access.

As well as participants relating to the main signatories to the deal, researchers from the Dutch Royal Academy (KNAW) and the Universities of Applied Sciences can also make use of the offer.

== Open Science Pilots ==
As well as the read and publish aspects of the contract, a third section is included. Formally called Professional Services for Research Intelligence and Workflow and informally known as the Open Science Pilots, the research organisations and Elsevier agreed "to co-develop new services that help disseminate and evaluate knowledge. The parties will undertake a number of pilot projects to refine and adapt these services to meet the needs of the Dutch Research Institutions and to support the broader ambition of public engagement with science. These pilots will be conducted according to the collaboration principles as mentioned above."

As of 2021, two pilot services have started. The first (known as the Data Monitor) measures the take of research data publication by academics from Dutch research organisations. The second creates a shared website showing the research outputs of the Amsterdam Medical Centres (VUMC, AMC) and the collaborative research institutes (Cancer Center Amsterdam, Amsterdam NeuroScience, etc.).

== Cost ==
The contract costs the Dutch research organisations a combined amount of 16.4m Euros per year. The costs are then shared by individual organisations according to the kostenverdeelmodel.

== Criticism ==
The signing of the deal was not unanimously approved of in the Netherlands. While there was acknowledgement that it would increase the number of research articles freely available online, a number of criticisms were publicised. Specific issues raised included that is gave Elsevier a 'privileged partner' status (above other competitors) and that it increases the risk of vendor lock-in. More pointed criticism came from Sarah de Rijcke from Leiden University: the deal not only gave Elsevier a financial advantage but there was a significant risk that it would accelerate the transfer of intellectual capital from universities to a single company. Dr de Rijcke concluded that it is "disconcerting that this deal may effectively transfer crucial means to influence Dutch science policy to a monopolistic private enterprise."

There was also criticism from outside the Netherlands. A report from the German Research Foundation claimed that the contract was a deliberate attempt by Elsevier to offer researchers "a high level of convenience [while] users also disclose their data across various platforms ... it remains unclear what happens to these user traces". More generally, such contracts were in contradiction with "ethical values such as transparency and traceability"
