= KNBF Bondsbibliotheek =

The library logo.

The KNBF Bondsbibliotheek is a philatelic library of the Royal Dutch Association of Philatelic Societies (Dutch: Koninklijke Nederlandse Bond van Filatelistenverenigingen (KNBF)). The library is located in the town of Houten in the province of Utrecht, in the Netherlands.

== History ==
The library has been assembled since the end of World War Two by acquisition and donations.

== Collection ==
The collection comprises over 10,000 items including books, journals and monographs. The emphasis is on Dutch philately with strengths also in German, French and British literature.

== See also ==
- List of libraries in the Netherlands
