= Rijksmuseum Research Library =

Art history research library in the Netherlands

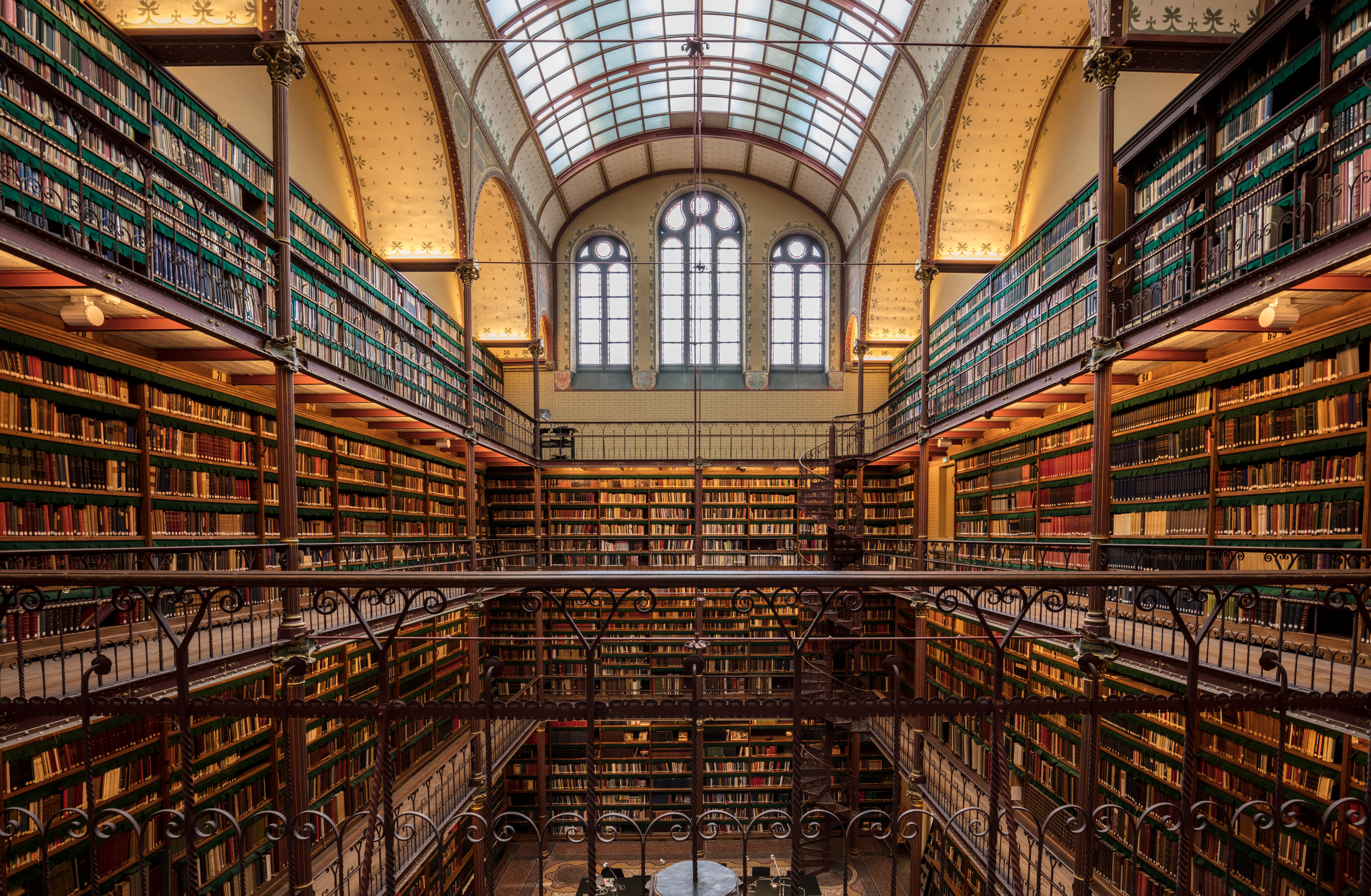
- The Rijksmuseum Research Library
- 52.354°N 4.8802°E
- Location: Museumstraat 1 Amsterdam, Netherlands, Netherlands
- Type: Research library
- Scope: Art history
- Established: 1885

Collection
- Size: 450,000 volumes

Access and use
- Access requirements: Free membership and identification

Other information
- Website: library.rijksmuseum.nl

The Rijksmuseum Research Library is the largest and oldest public art history research library in the Netherlands. The library is part of the Rijksmuseum in Amsterdam. The profile of the library collection parallels that of the museum. The online catalogue contains over 400,000 monographs, 3,400 periodicals and 90,000 art sales catalogues. About 50,000 art sales catalogues published before 1989 are not yet entered in the online catalogue. The collection grows, on average, by 10,000 to 15,000 books, auction catalogues, and periodicals every year.

== History ==
The library, also known as the Cuypers Library, opened in 1885 jointly with the rest of the Rijksmuseum. It is the largest of its kind in the Netherlands. It was designed by Pierre Cuypers, a Dutch architect famous for his neo-Gothic style. When designing the library, Cuypers strived to create “a space with a sense of grandeur, which appears larger than it is.”

The reduced size of the support points at the top and the bottom create the illusion of greater height and grant the entire space a loftier appearance, thus achieving Cuypers' objective. Since its creation, the library has undergone considerable renovations to restore and improve the building.

== Visitors ==
After the renovation which started in 2004, the library transformed into a classical reading room, with information about the collections of the museum. An extensive collection of reference books and journals is available in the reading room.

Since April 14, 2013 the library has been housed in the main Rijksmuseum building, Museumstraat 1, Amsterdam. The library is open Monday to Saturday, 10 AM until 5 PM, closed on Sundays and on public holidays.

== See also ==
- List of libraries in the Netherlands
