= Research library =

Library that supports scholarly research

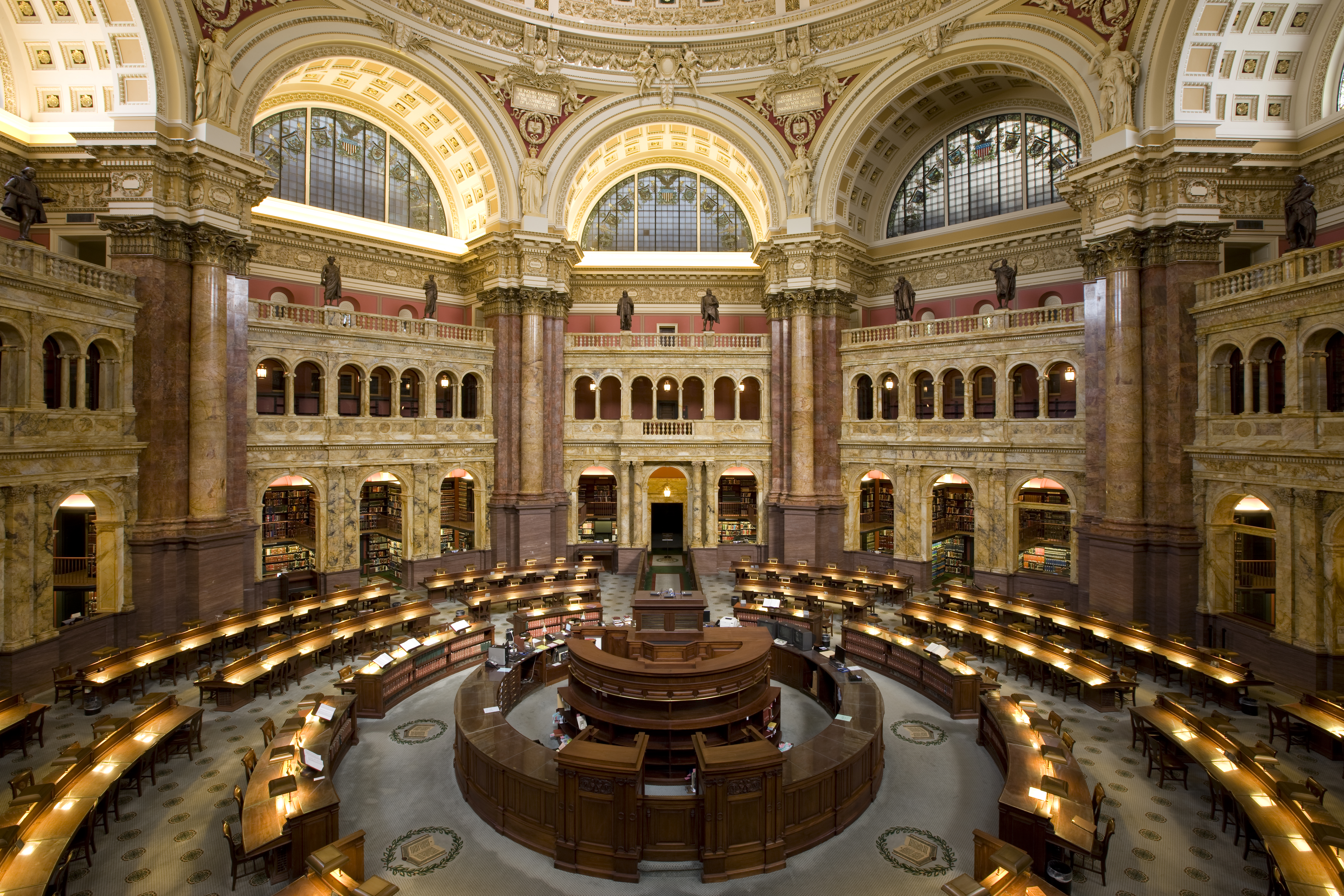
The Library of Congress is one of the largest research libraries in the world.

A research library is a library that contains an in-depth collection of material on one or several subjects, including primary and secondary sources. Research libraries are established to meet research needs and, as such, are stocked with authentic materials with quality content. Research libraries are typically attached to academic or research institutions that specialize in that topic and serve members of that institution. Large university libraries are considered research libraries, and often contain many specialized branch research libraries. The libraries provide research materials for students and staff of these organizations to use and can also publish and carry literature produced by these institutions and make them available to others. Research libraries could also be accessible to members of the public who wish to gain in-depth knowledge on that particular topic.

Research libraries face a unique challenge of making research materials accessible and available to patrons. They also need to ensure there are no copyright-related issues with their materials, ensure that as many materials as possible are open access, and ensure all their materials are reliably sourced.

Some specialized research libraries could include those affiliated to governmental organizations which may hold documents of historical, legal or political import, or music libraries which will have books and journals on music, as well as films and recordings for musicians to access.

Research libraries will generally have materials that are typically non-fiction and scholarly. These traditionally included books, periodicals, journals, newspapers, manuscripts and cassette tapes. With the advent of technology, this has evolved to include CDs, DVDs, Ebooks, audiobooks and online research catalogues. Research library collections are focused on one or more subjects or fields of study and the material available on those topics are typically more extensive and in-depth than that found in public lending libraries. Institutions such as universities may have multiple research libraries on campus, each dedicated to different faculties or subjects.

Research libraries may also publish their own scholarly research which is conducted by their librarians on their topics of choice.

== History ==
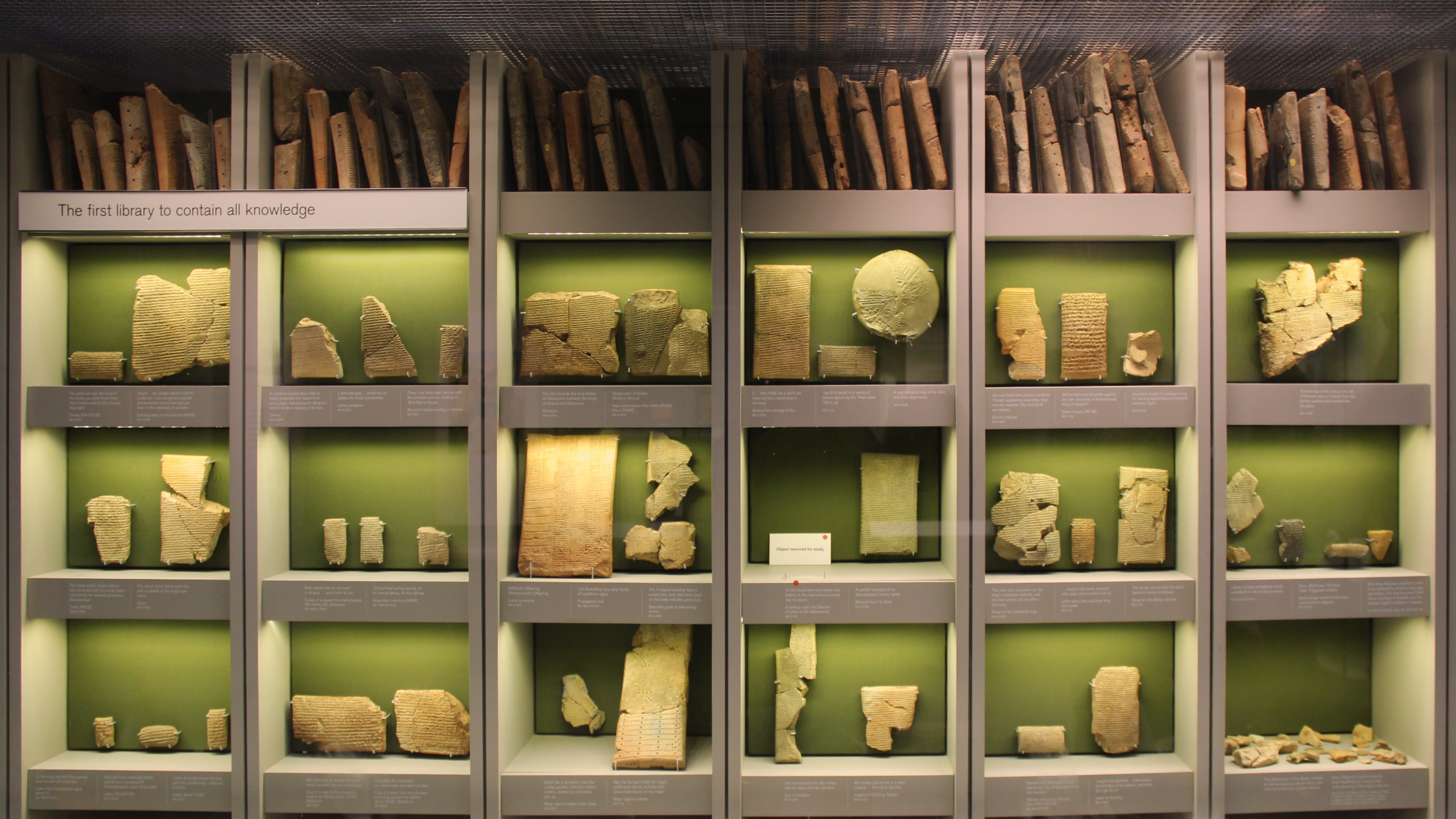
Artifacts from the Library of Ashurbanipal, established in the 7th century BC in present-day Iraq

Libraries first appeared in Southwest Asia more than 5,000 years ago as repositories to store written resources for retrieval, often written on materials like bamboo, clay, and later papyrus. The most durable of these materials was clay, and tablets made of clay are the most common artifacts retrieved from ancient library sites. Many great civilizations built libraries which contained knowledge and information that were accumulated over years, sometimes centuries, and from across regions.

The oldest known library in the world was excavated in Ebla in northern Syria. Excavation of the site of the ancient city began in 1964 and archeologists have since uncovered more than 20,000 clay tablets that documented the economic and cultural life of the city's residents. Archives dating back to 3000 BC were also discovered in 1975. The library also contained scientific records and observations on topics such as zoology, mineralogy, and information on Ebla's business and tax issues.

One of the greatest ancient libraries in the world was the Library of Ashurbanipal, which was founded in the 7th century BC in Nineveh, near present-day Iraq, by the Assyrian king Ashurbanipal. The library contained around 30,000 cuneiform tablets written in multiple languages pertaining to scholarly texts, archival documents and religious materials along with some works of ancient literature. The king sent his scribes to other libraries in the region to record their contents to create a register of contents.

Probably the most renowned library in the ancient world was the Great Library of Alexandria, in Egypt. The library was part of the royal complex that included the research institution known as the Mouseion, and is believed to have been established during the reigns of Ptolemy I Soter (367–283 BC) and his son Ptolemy II Philadelphus (285–246 BC). There are report that the library at its height had up to 400,000 scrolls, though there is uncertainty regarding the exact number and how many scrolls were original works, as some of these may have been copies. The works collected covered a wide range of topics including works by Homer, Herodotus, Plato, and Aristotle. The library drew scholars from across the world and led to Alexandria being known as a hub for knowledge and learning.

The US Library of Congress is one of the largest and most well-known research libraries in the world. It is the United States Congress' official research library and is the oldest federal cultural institution in the country, having been founded in 1800. It contains more than 170 million items that cover a wide range of subjects from across the world and in 470 different languages. The library has offices abroad through which it is able to acquire and maintain materials that are not easily available through traditional acquisition methods.

== Services ==
Research libraries can be either reference libraries, which do not lend their holdings, or lending libraries, which do lend all or some of their holdings. Some extremely large or traditional research libraries are entirely reference in this sense, lending none of their material; most academic research libraries, at least in the U.S., now lend books, but not periodicals or other material. Books available in research libraries can include textbooks, journals and rare manuscripts. As the contents of research libraries are so focused, there can sometimes be a high demand for certain book titles. To ensure that as many patrons as possible can have access to the books they need, libraries have reserve collections, the books of which are only available for short-term loans. These loans can range from a few days to as short as a few hours. Patrons can also gain access to periodicals and journals that require paid subscriptions through their libraries which they can use to access primary research materials.

A research library is often connected to the services of the university related to scholarly communication, such as support for open access journals run by the institution and the operation of an institutional repository, as well as support for the usage of other institutions' repositories and open archives through discovery tools and academic search engines like BASE, CORE and Unpaywall.

Rare books and manuscripts are often very valuable and can sometimes be fragile. These are often not available for loan, and can only be accessed within the library and sometimes under the supervision of the librarian. Rare books are those that were printed before 1850 and of which very few copies still exist today. They are highly valuable for research purposes as they often form the basis of historical research. Having a rare book in a library's collection is very prestigious and is often indicative of the library's high standards for materials.

Libraries may also have archives of old photographs, films, musical scores and even artwork. They often also have archives of old newspapers and periodicals. Newspapers are often accessible through microfiche machines, which are used to view images of back issues of such publications. Research libraries also often provide patrons with basic technological equipment such as computers, scanners and printers to aid them in their work.

These libraries frequently collaborate with one another to share resources through inter-library loans. This enables each library to meet the needs of more patrons while keeping their costs down. Libraries may also collaborate to share the costs features such as licensing information sources. This is especially important today, with libraries being required to offer more services for their patrons with fewer resources.

=== Research librarians ===
Librarians at research libraries are responsible for curating the library's collections. They identify the best books and resources by reading catalogues, publishers' announcements and book reviews, and acquire them for the libraries. These resources are often of high quality and are from trusted sources and publishers. They also catalogue and organize the books and resources, maintain and repair books as required. Librarians can also work with colleagues in other institutions to share resources and better the relationships between institutions.

Librarians who work in research libraries often have in-depth knowledge of the subjects that are the focus of the institutions in which they work. They are therefore able to answer more specific topical queries that patrons might have while also giving advice on the best resources to access for the necessary information. They conduct informational or reference interviews with patrons to ascertain what information they are looking for, and the purpose behind their research. This can help them to direct users to the appropriate databases or materials or in some cases obtaining these materials from external sources for them.

With the changing role of libraries, research librarians' roles have evolved to include more than just selecting and maintaining the library's offerings and books, and helping patrons locate the items of their choice. Today, librarians must also be technologically savvy so they can teach users how to use the library's electronic systems.

Many librarians conduct their own independent research on topics pertaining to a library's field or on the topic of libraries themselves. When the library is affiliated with an academic institution, librarians may even have quotas on how much research they must complete and how many papers they should publish. Oftentimes, these librarians have to meet their quotas in order to be eligible for promotions or even tenure positions at the library. Librarians' research can help to improve the level of service offered by the staff of the institution by increasing their knowledge of the investigative process. The research conducted may also support the operations of the library.

Librarians also spearhead the digitization projects of any primary research sources that the library might have. These sources are typically the result of research projects conducted by the librarians affiliated with that institution. Digitization projects are often intensive and long-drawn. Librarians need to identify which materials should be digitized and the priority in which they should be digitized. They also need to ascertain what formats will be most suitable for the materials and the patrons, raise the necessary funds and obtain the rights to digitize the items. They then need to prepare the original documents, have them scanned or otherwise converted and ensure that all the necessary metadata is added. They then have to perform quality checks to ensure that the material is of the highest quality and fit to be released to the public.

=== Future prospects ===
With the rapid advancement of technology and the advent of the digital age, consumers' expectations are changing and libraries are being required to improve their digital infrastructure. This phenomenon began in the early 2010s and has been accelerated due to the COVID-19 pandemic when many libraries across the world were physically closed forcing patrons to rely solely on their electronic offerings. Libraries have had to update their technological infrastructure in order to keep up with the new demands of the public.

The first step the average person takes when they conduct research is no longer visiting the library but searching for information online. Patrons will obtain a basic understanding of their topic and identify the books or materials they need before ever setting foot in a library. They can also identify which libraries will provide them the most convenient access to these materials through online archives and catalogues. This is what makes effective digitization projects in libraries and the maintenance of accurate online catalogues crucial for libraries' continued survival. Libraries may also have functions on their websites which enable patrons to email librarians with questions directly to obtain answers in a quick and efficient manner and also ensure that questions will be addressed by the most qualified party.

Libraries are now required to have extensive digital collections which comprise electronic journals, ebooks and virtual reference services. They must also make their catalogues available online for users to quickly determine whether the library has the materials they need and when and how these materials will be available for their use. Many libraries also have interlinked systems that enable patrons to reserve and borrow books from affiliated libraries, effectively increasing their collection size while keeping costs down. This can make it possible for libraries to offer resources that have a narrow appeal and a low demand but that could still be useful for patrons to access.

Libraries are also required to be more efficient to meet both consumer demand and to keep up with continuing budget cuts. One benefit of increasing digitization is that it enables greater automation of workflows within libraries which ensures that they become more streamlined. These increased efficiencies ensure libraries and their librarians are able to provide the highest quality service possible.

== Gallery ==
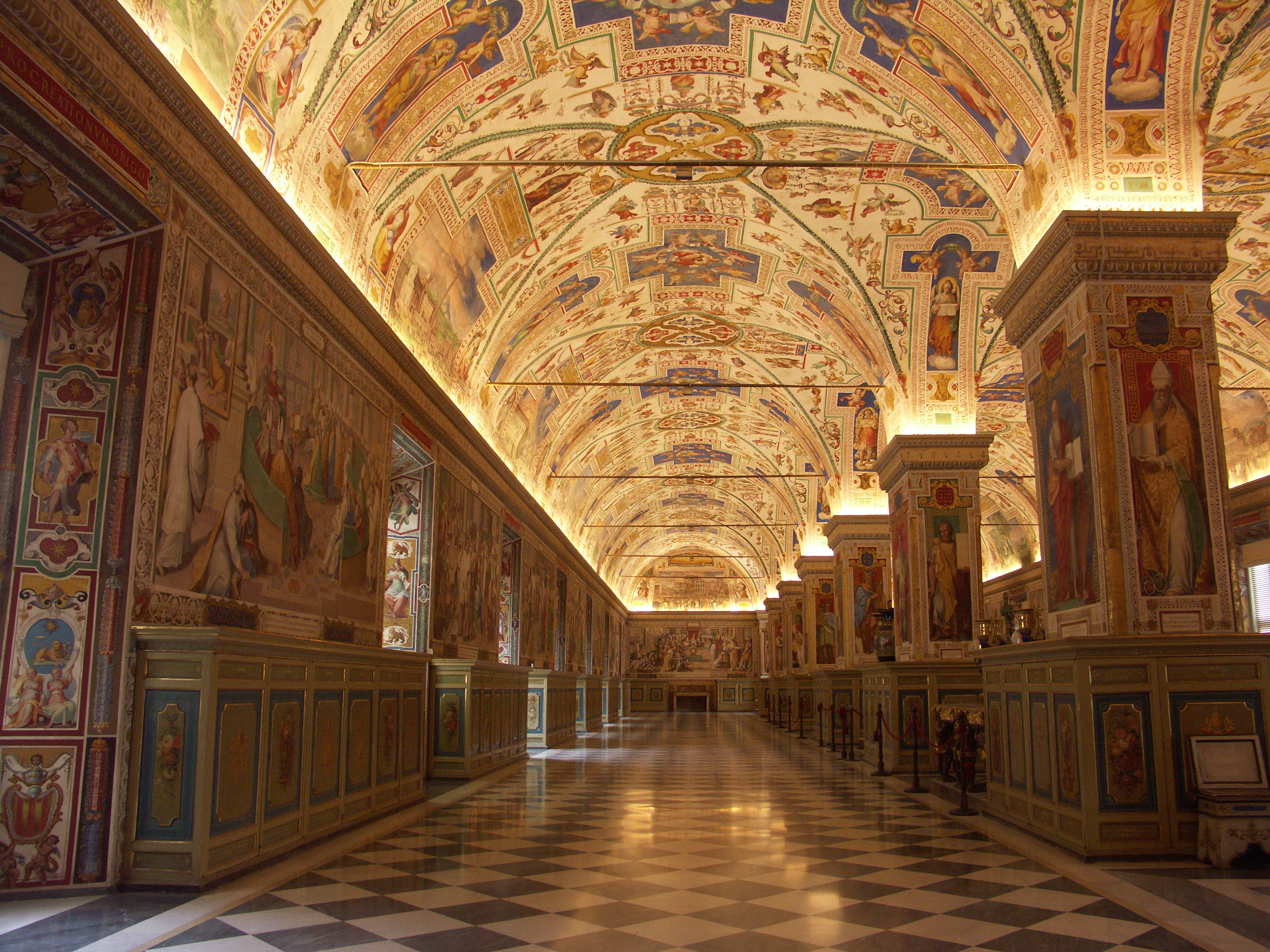
The Sistine Hall of the Vatican Library, Vatican City

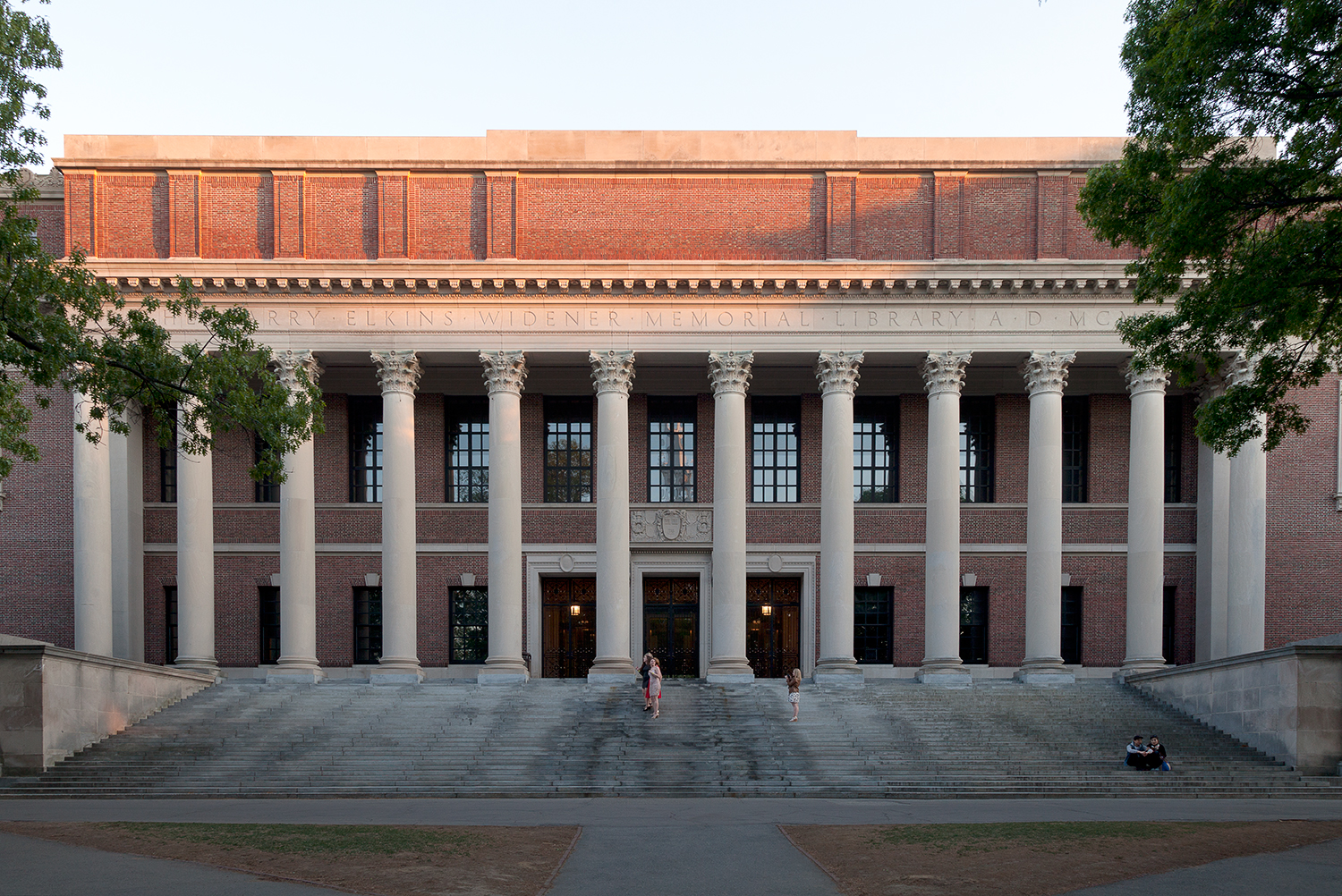
Widener Library at Harvard University is one of the largest research libraries in the world.

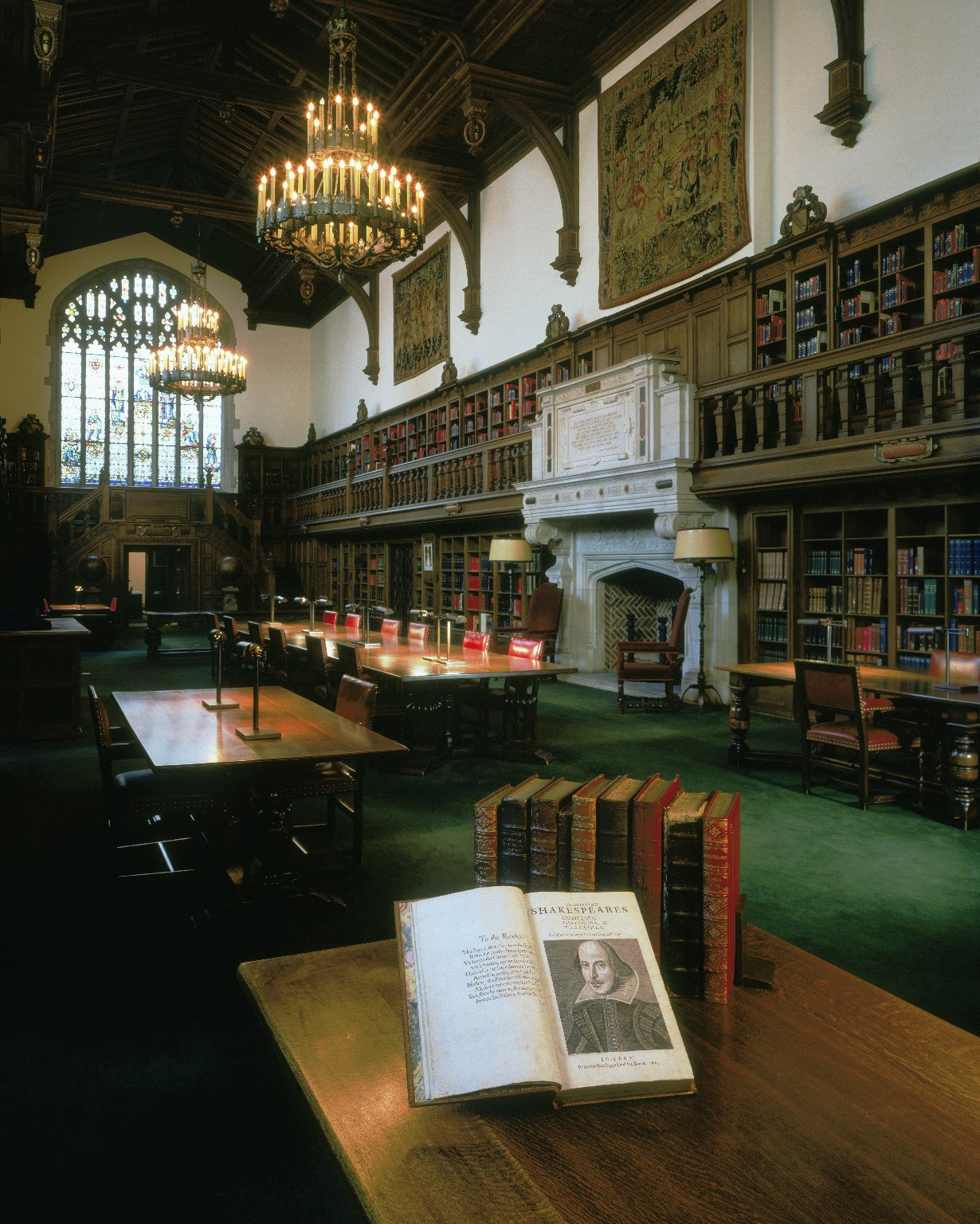
Folger Shakespeare Library, Washington, D.C.

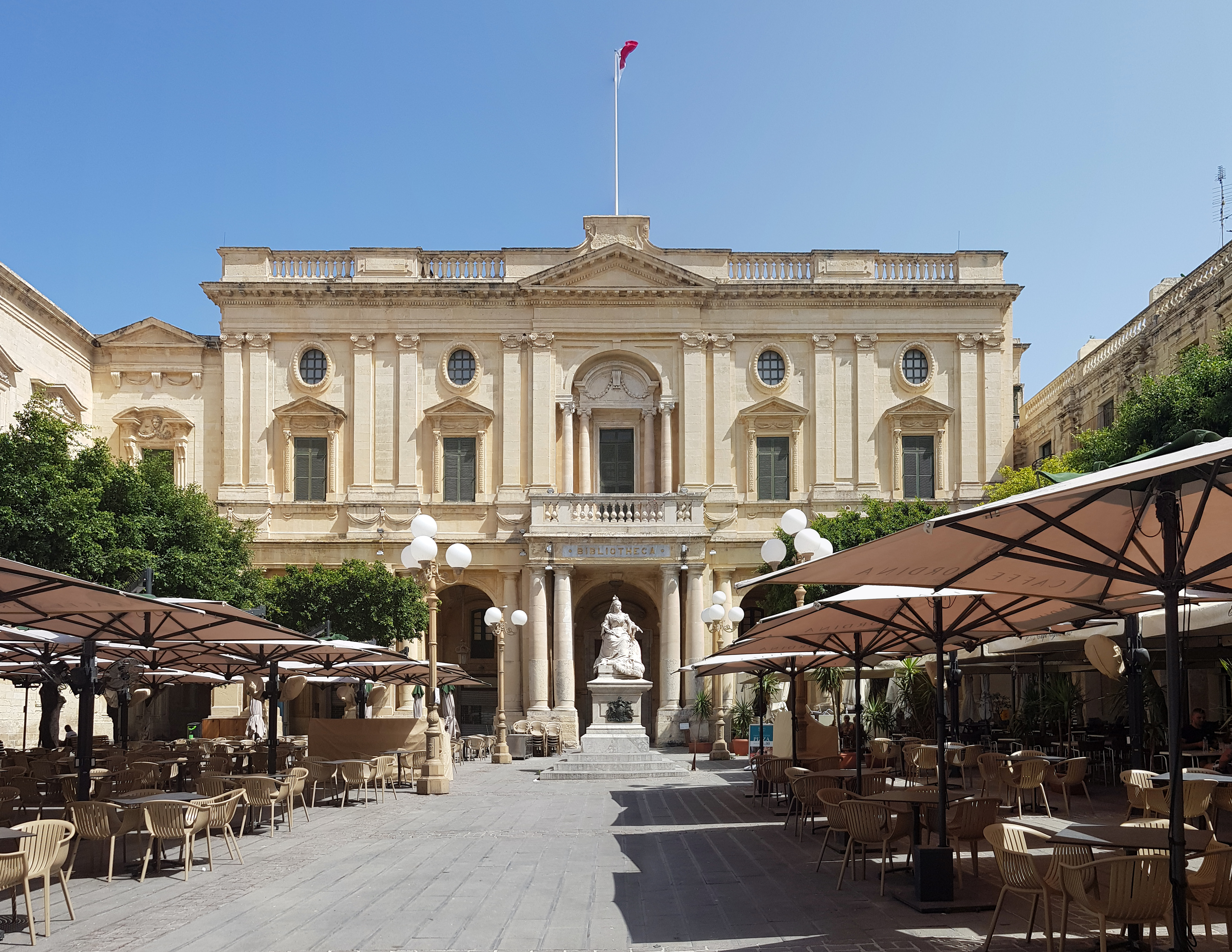
The National Library of Malta in Valletta

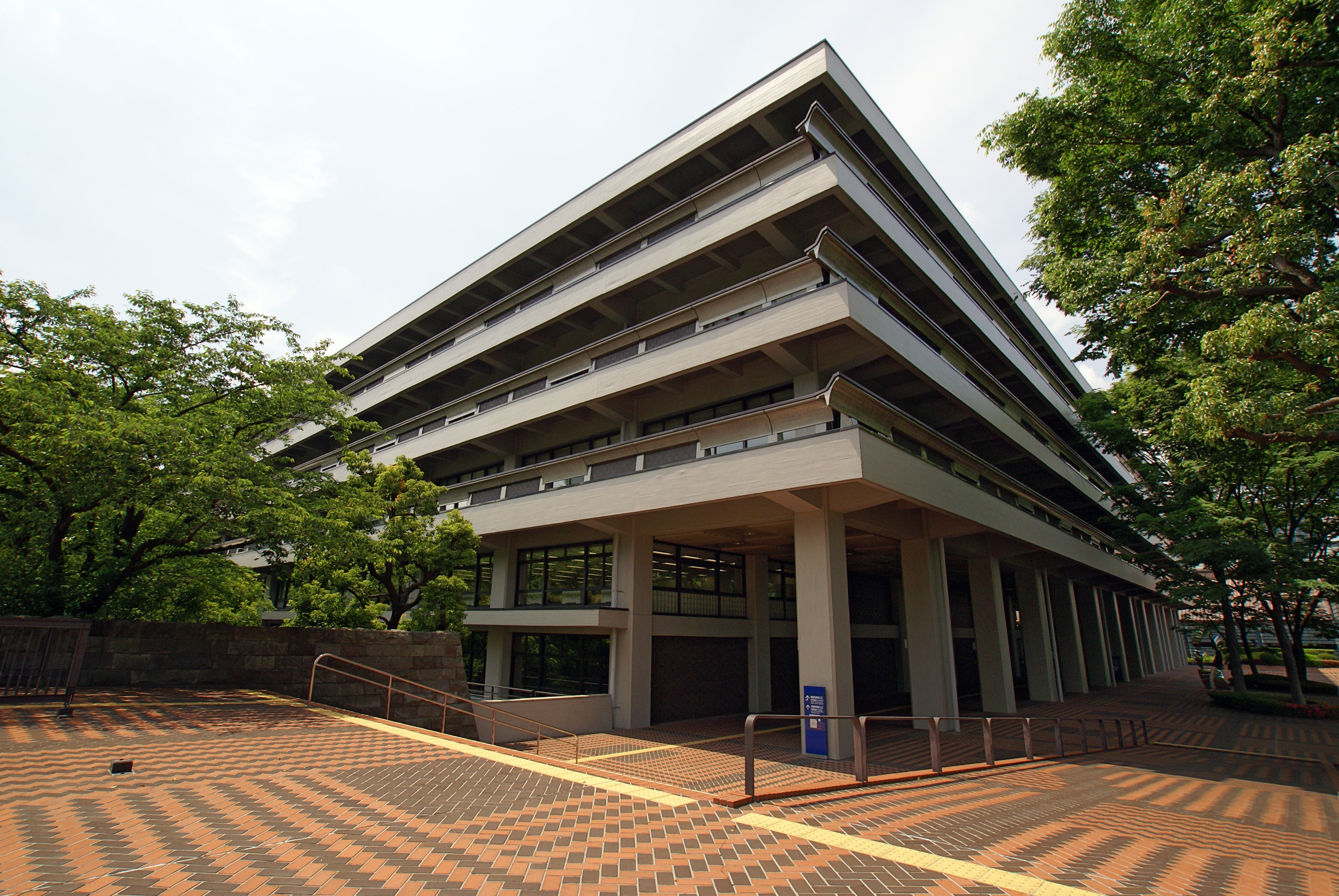
The National Diet Library of Japan

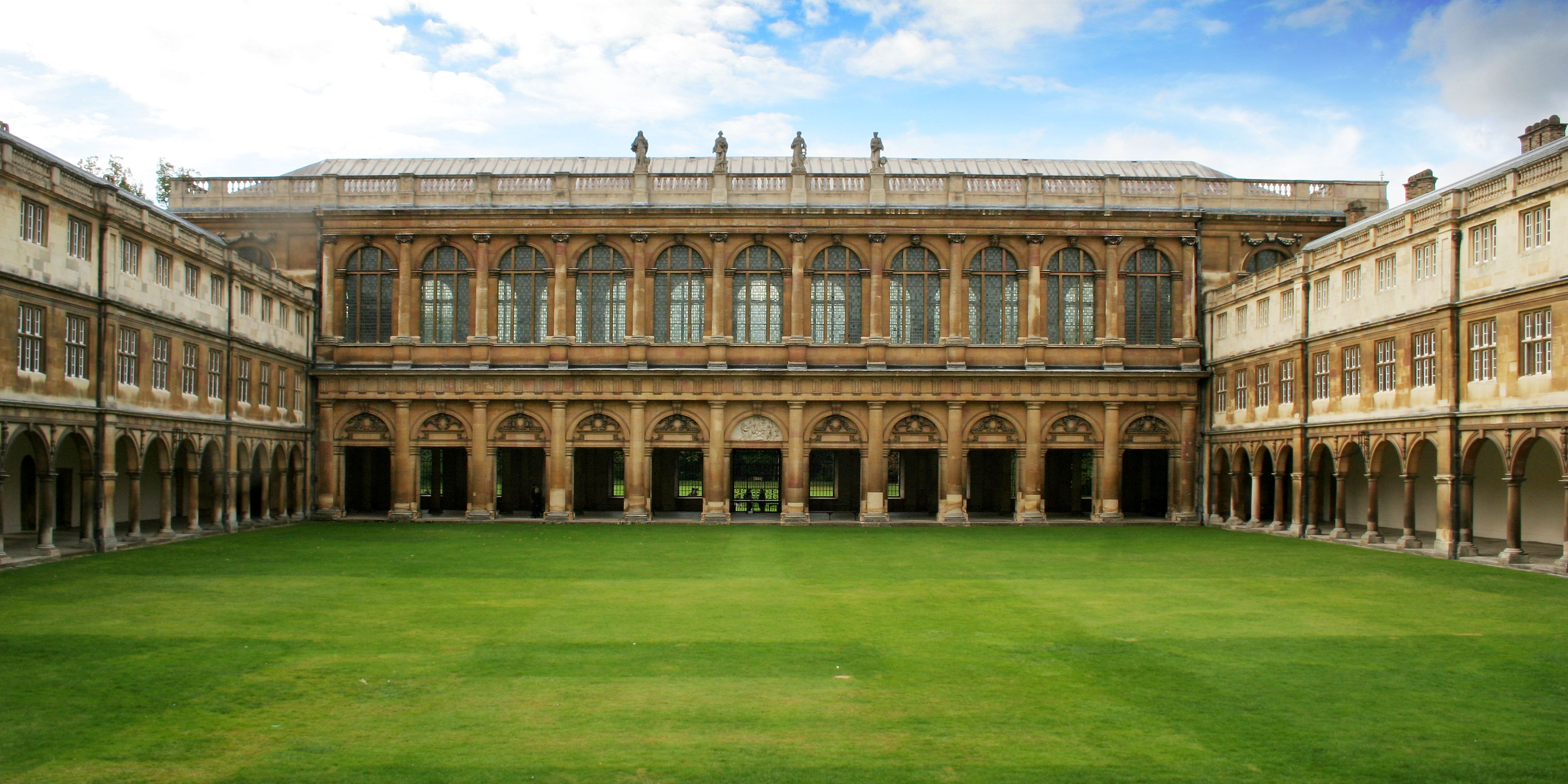
Wren Library, Trinity College, Cambridge University

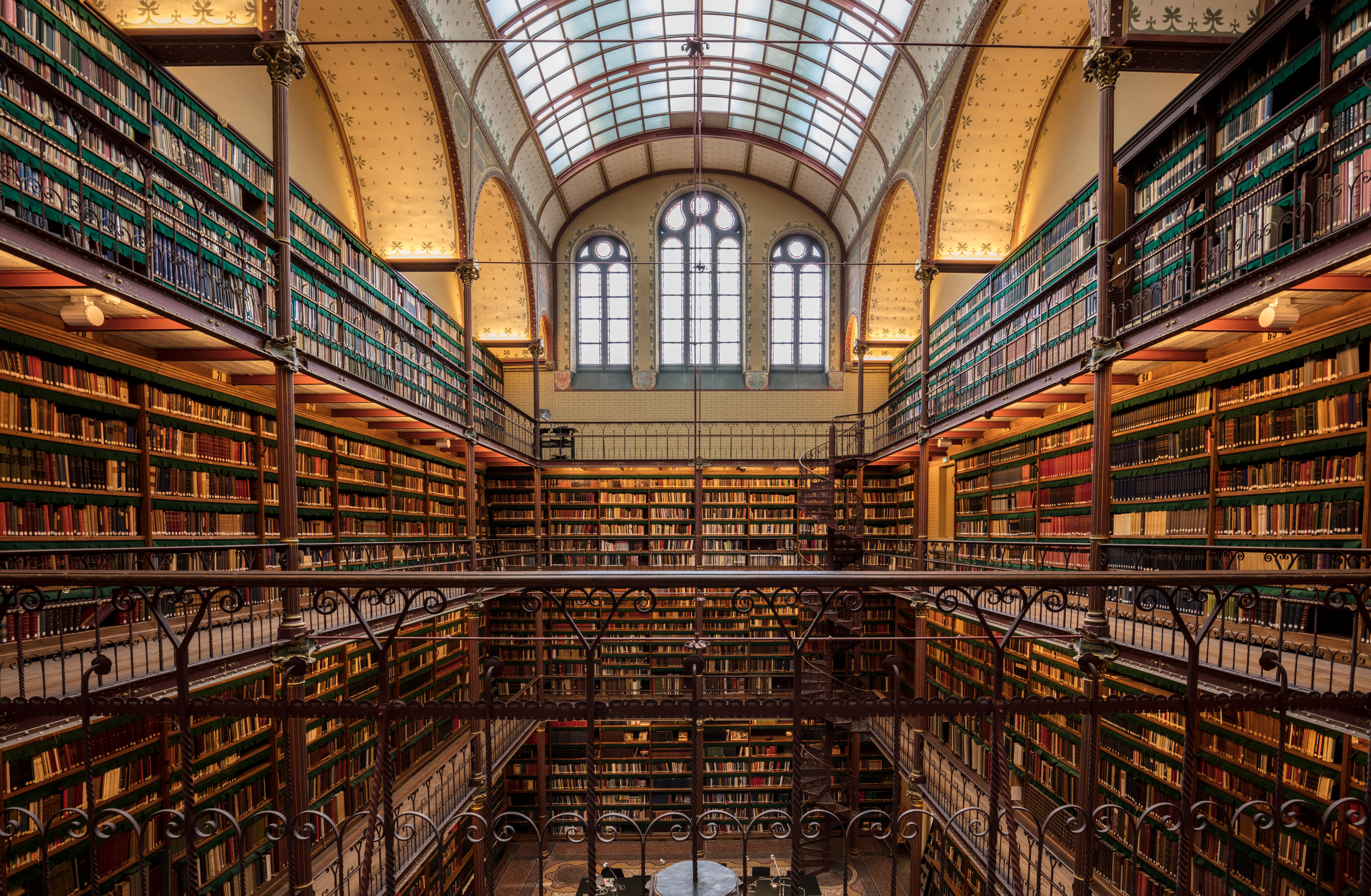
The Rijksmuseum Research Library in Amsterdam, the Netherlands

== See also ==
- Academic library
- Trends in library usage
- Research Libraries Group
- JSTOR
