= Open access in the Netherlands =

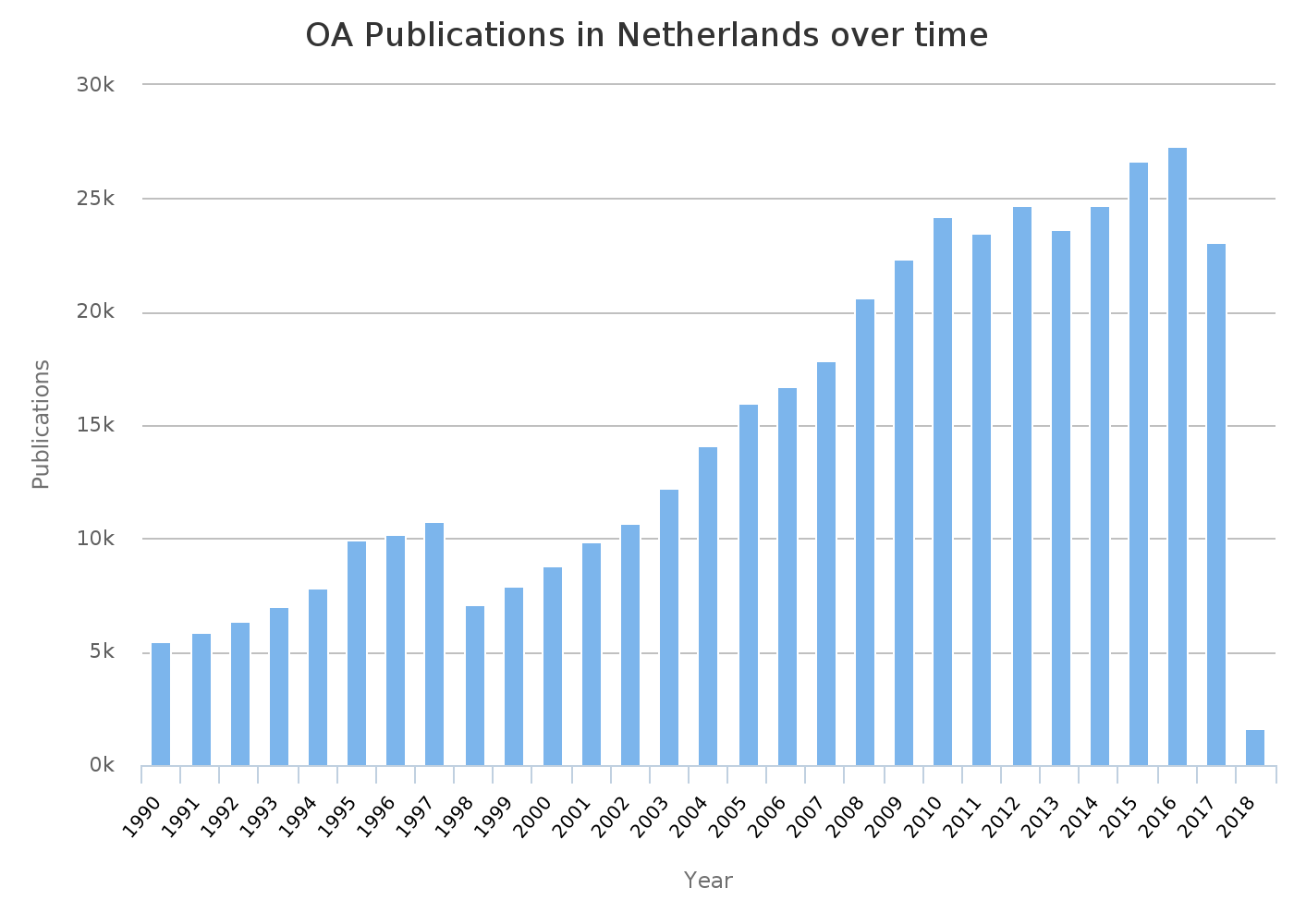
Growth of open access publications in the Netherlands, 1990–2018

Scholarly communication of the Netherlands published in open access form can be found by searching the National Academic Research and Collaboration Information System (NARCIS). The web portal was developed in 2004 by the Data Archiving and Networked Services of the Dutch Research Council (NWO) and Royal Netherlands Academy of Arts and Sciences.

Brill Publishers, National Library of the Netherlands, OAPEN Foundation, Stichting Fair Open Access Alliance, Utrecht University Library, and VU University Amsterdam Library belong to the Open Access Scholarly Publishers Association.

== Policy ==
The Dutch government has voiced the ambition that by 2019 60% of all publications from Dutch research universities should be published as open access, and by 2024 this should be 100%. The Society of Dutch Universities is negotiating big deals with publishers, where open access publication for Dutch corresponding authors is free of additional charge. In 2020, the Dutch research organised signed a four year transformative agreement with publishers Elsevier. In October 2024 it was reported that in 2023 94.6% of the publications resulting from grants from NWO and ZonMw were open access.

== Repositories ==
There are some 36 collections of scholarship in the Netherlands housed in digital open access repositories.

== See also ==
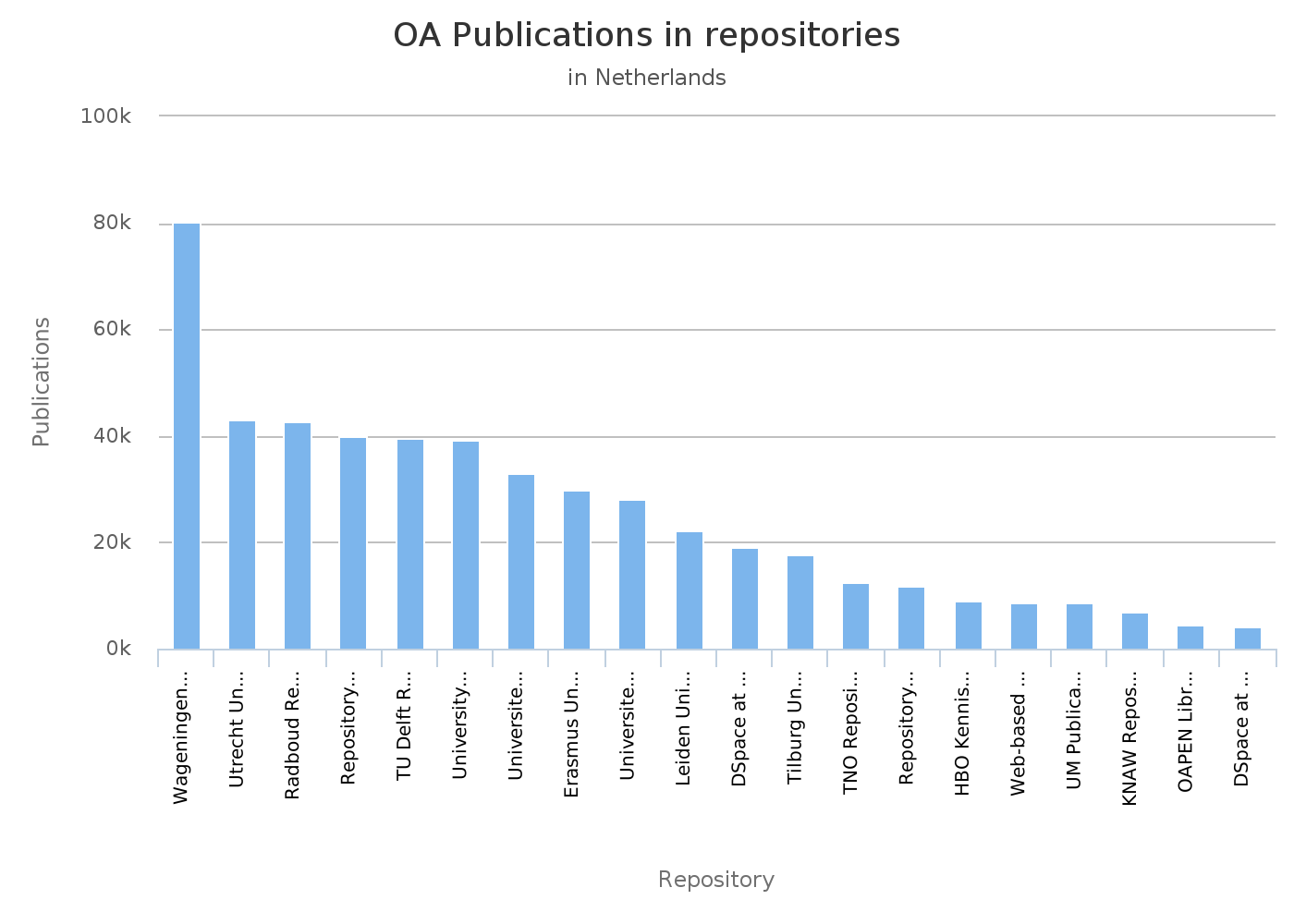
Number of open access publications in various Dutch repositories, 2018

- Internet in the Netherlands
- Education in the Netherlands
- Media of the Netherlands
- Copyright law of the Netherlands
- List of libraries in the Netherlands
- Open access in other countries
- Plan S
