= NARCIS =

NARCIS (National Academic Research and Collaboration Information System) of the Netherlands was an online portal for searching Dutch scientific research publications and data. As of July 2018, NARCIS indexed 268,989 data sets and 1,707,486 publications, including a significant proportion of open access works.

It started in 2004 as a project of the Koninklijke Nederlandse Akademie van Wetenschappen, Information Centre of the Radboud University of Nijmegen (METIS), Nederlandse Organisatie voor Wetenschappelijk Onderzoek, and Vereniging van Universiteiten. Since 2011 the Data Archiving and Networked Services (DANS) operated NARCIS from headquarters in The Hague. In 2015, it was decided to replace the Digital Author Identifier used until then with the International Standard Name Identifier or ORCID. As of 3 July 2023, the portal has been decommissioned.

== See also ==
- Open access in the Netherlands
