= Universiteiten van Nederland =

Universiteiten van Nederland (UNL), previously Vereniging van Universiteiten (VSNU; 'Association of Universities in the Netherlands') until November 2021, is a trade group of government-funded research universities, including three special universities, and the Open University of the Netherlands. It formed as the Vereniging van Samenwerkende Nederlandse Universiteiten in 1985, as a successor to the Academische Raad (est. 1956).

== Organization ==
The UNL acts as a consultative body for its members. It is also the mouthpiece for universities in the national media. It represents university education and research in the Cabinet of the Netherlands, the House of Representatives, and the European Union, and in price negotiations with academic publishers such as Elsevier, Springer, and the Royal Society of Chemistry (UK). It is the employers' organization of Dutch universities.

The association was located in Utrecht until 2005. The institutions that are important for university policy, however, are often headquartered in The Hague. To optimize the interests of the universities towards these institutions, the UNL moved to The Hague in March 2005.

Almost every country in the world has a university association that brings together common interests. There is also an umbrella of European university associations (the European University Association) and of universities worldwide (the International Association of Universities).

== Members ==
The association consists of the following 14 institutions:

- Erasmus Universiteit Rotterdam
- Open Universiteit Nederland
- Radboud Universiteit
- Rijksuniversiteit Groningen
- Technische Universiteit Delft
- Technische Universiteit Eindhoven
- Universiteit van Amsterdam
- Universiteit Leiden
- Universiteit Maastricht
- Tilburg University
- Universiteit Twente
- Universiteit Utrecht
- Vrije Universiteit Amsterdam
- Wageningen University & Research

In 2022, the Universiteit voor Humanistiek (University of Humanistic Studies) became an associated member.

== See also ==
- Open access in the Netherlands
- Vlaamse Interuniversitaire Raad (Flemish university council in Belgium)
- List of employer associations
